= Innere Westvorstadt =

Coordinates: 51°20′17.09″N 12°22′4.43″E

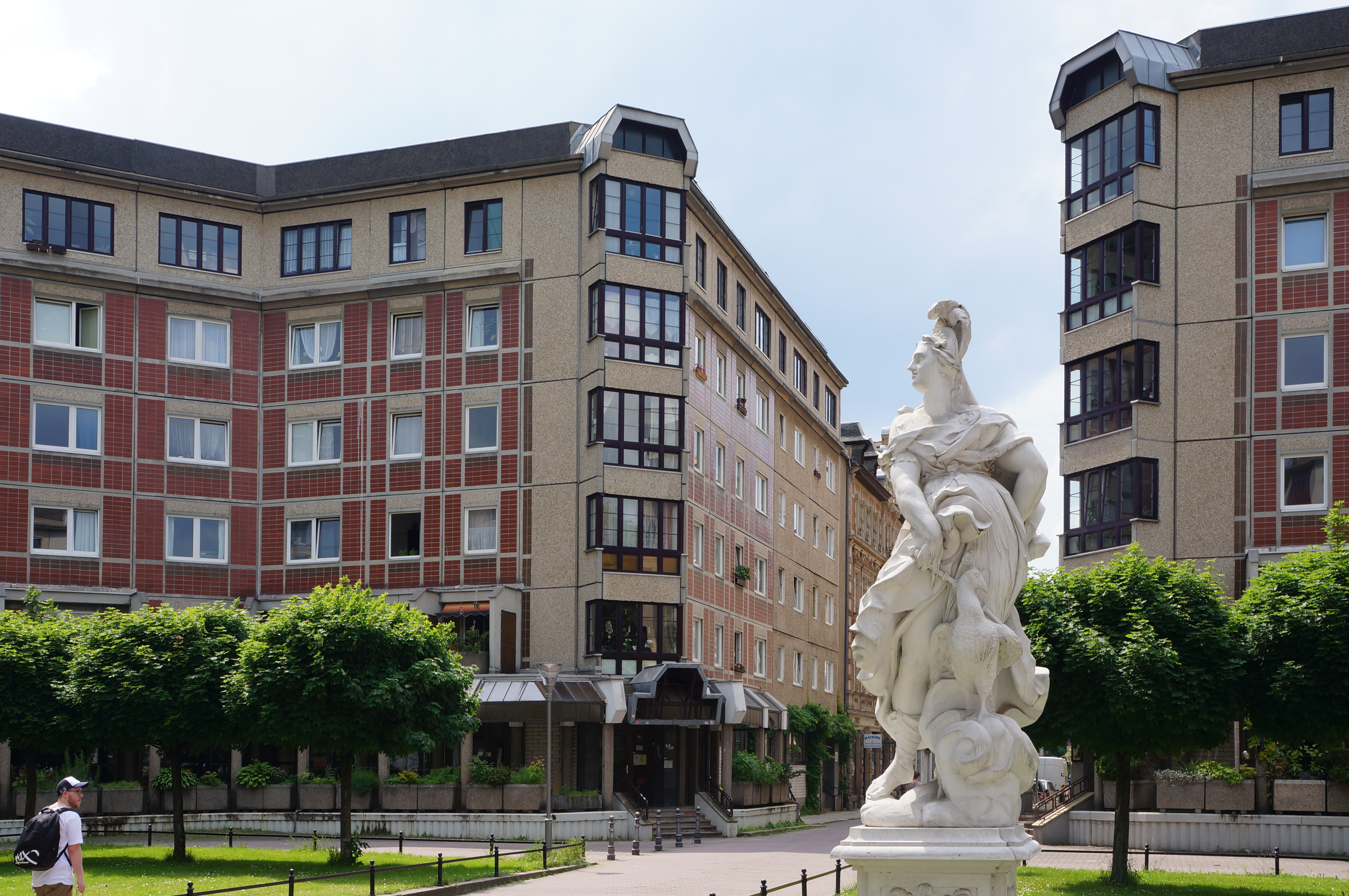
Dorotheenplatz with the beginning of Kolonnadenstrasse and a copy of a Permoser sculpture from Apel's garden (2013)

The Innere Westvorstadt (lit. 'Inner west Vorstadt') is a neighbourhood and residential area in Leipzig, Germany, immediately west of the city centre, and belongs to the borough (Stadtbezirk) of Leipzig-Mitte. The term is mainly used in historical, urban planning and regional contexts. In common parlance, the area around Kolonnadenstrasse and Dorotheenplatz, which was built in place of Reichel's garden, is more likely to be called the Kolonnadenviertel. The northern part, around the Schauspielhaus (theater house) and the Gottschedstrasse pub mile, on the other hand, is called the Schauspielviertel. The Schauspiel Leipzig, the University of Music and Theatre Leipzig, the Theaterhaus Schille and established artists in Kolonnadenstraße shape the district artistically.

== Location ==
The neighbourhood is located immediately west of the centre of Leipzig. It is bordered by the main roads Jahnallee and Ranstädter Steinweg in the north, the Inner City Ring Road in the east, Karl-Tauchnitz-Strasse in the south, and Friedrich-Ebert-Strasse in the west. Neighboring districts are the Waldstraßenviertel in the north, the Bachviertel with the Johannapark in the west and the Musikviertel in the south.

After the municipal division of 1992, the Innere Westvorstadt forms the locality of Zentrum-West together with the Bachviertel, the Johannapark and the former site of the Deutsche Hochschule für Körperkultur (German University of Physical Culture, abbrev. DHfK).

== History ==
=== Gardens in front of the city ===
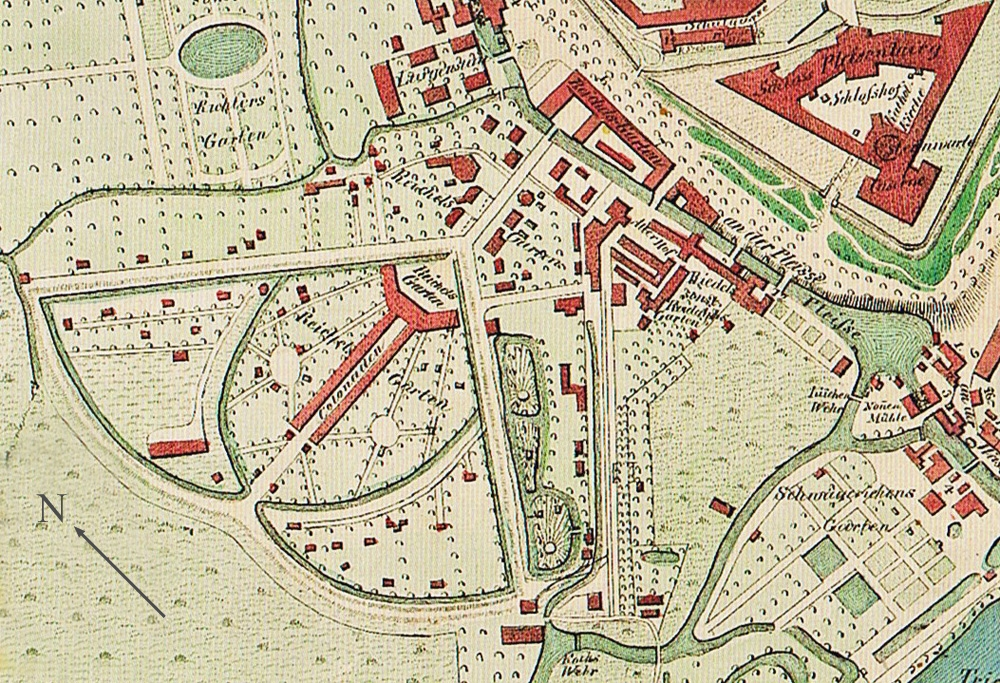
Reichel's garden around 1840

In the Middle Ages, only the Naundörfchen in the northernmost tip of today's Westvorstadt (between Goerdelerring and Ranstädter Steinweg) was inhabited. The Via Regia, an important west–east long-distance trade route, ran along today's Ranstädter Steinweg.

In the 17th and 18th centuries, Leipzig grew beyond its city walls, with the first residential areas being built to the north, east and south. In the landscape west of the city, which is dominated by rivers, extensive development was not yet possible due to the risk of flooding. Here, wealthy merchants laid out spacious gardens that served as recreation and representation. The most important were Apel's and Richter's garden as well as the Kleinbosische and Lurgenstein's garden. Apel's garden in particular shaped today's structure. The paths laid out in the form of a fan determine today's street network and the colonnades of the main path gave the Kolonnadenstrasse (colonnade street) its name.

== Buildings since the 19th century ==
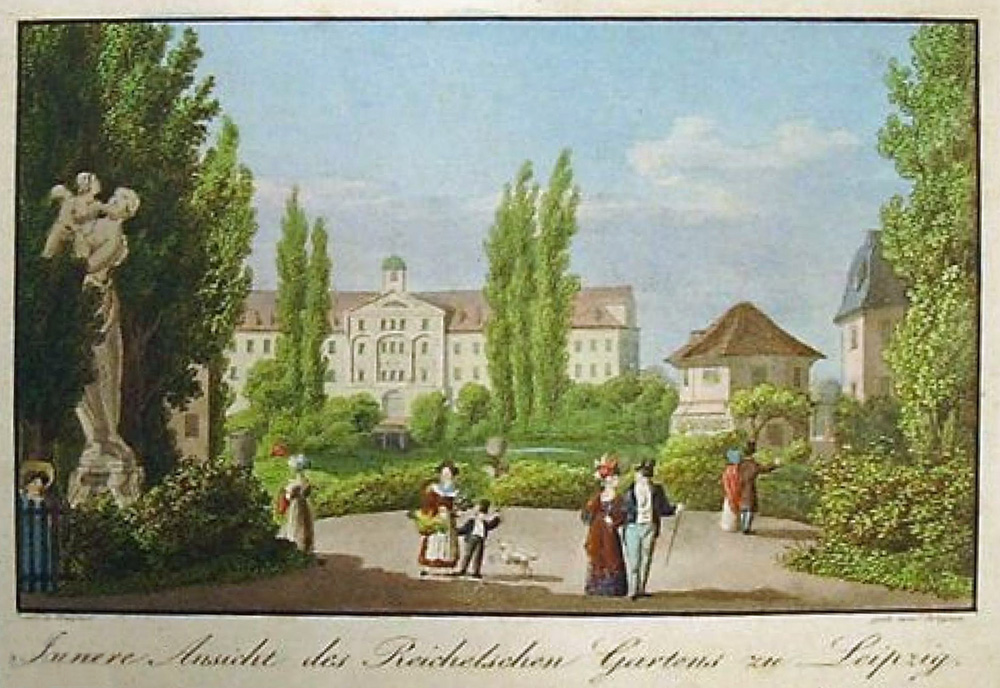
First buildings in Reichel's garden

After the merchant Erdmann Traugott Reichel acquired Apel's garden in 1787, the area received its first larger buildings. In Reichel's garden, summer houses, businesses and residential buildings were built, in which personalities such as Felix Mendelssohn Bartholdy, Friedrich Arnold Brockhaus and Benedictus Gotthelf Teubner lived and worked. The area-wide development is closely linked to Reichel's grandson Karl Heine. Since the river was regulated, drained and parcelled out of the garden in 1840, the locality was almost completely built on until the end of the 19th century. Inspired by Leipzig's rapid growth, neighboring gardens such as Rudolph's Garden and Lurgenstein's Garden were also built. The most important buildings of this time were the Catholic Church, the Central Hall and the Leipzig Synagogue.

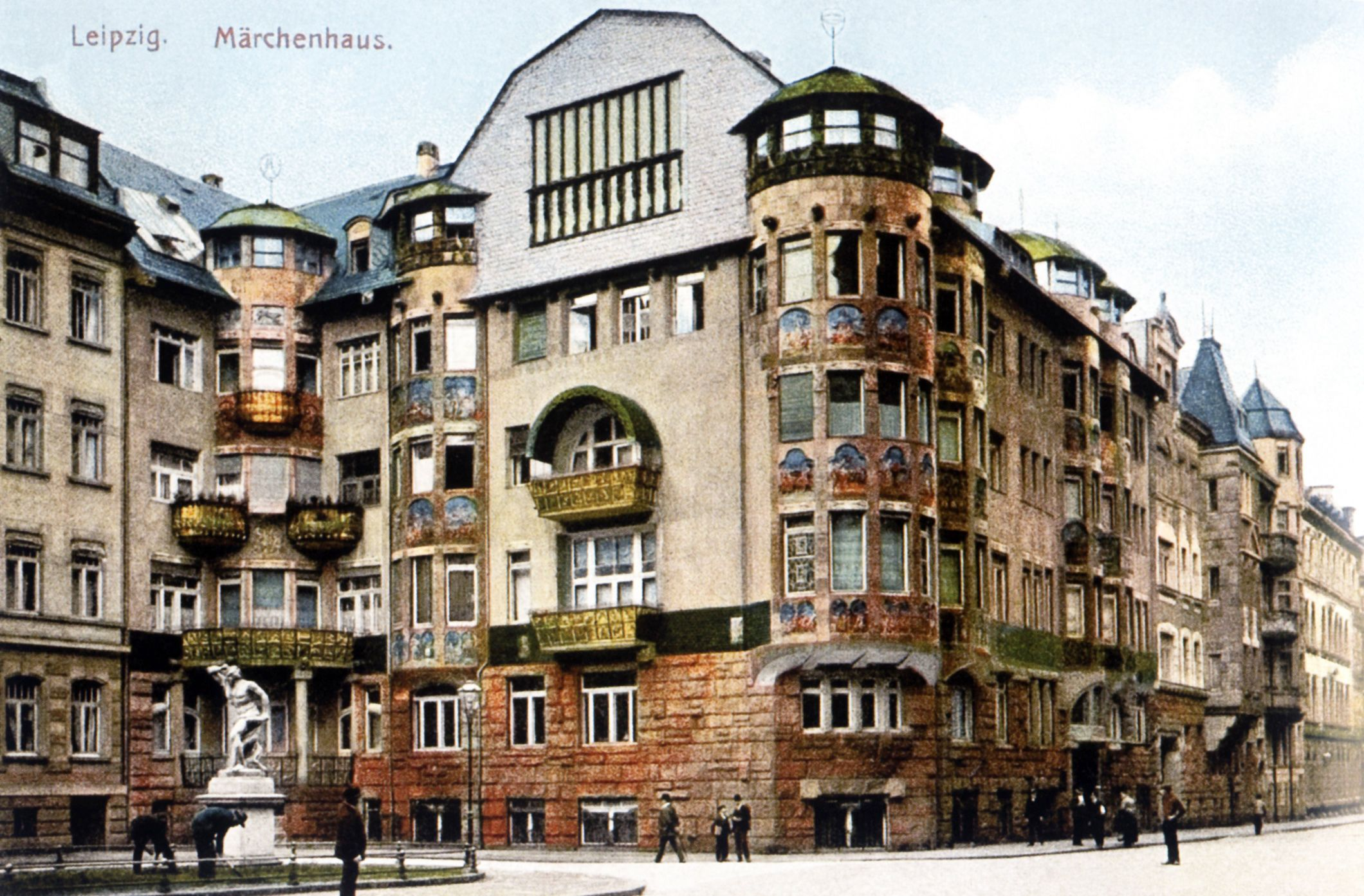
The "Fairytale House" (Märchenhaus) at Nikischplatz (around 1910)

At the turn of the 20th century, Leipzig's growing economic importance was reflected in the neighbourhood. Due to the proximity to the city centre, many buildings gave way to large, public and representative buildings, especially on the Promenadenring. In addition to magnificent residential buildings, the Kommandantur, the Kosmoshaus, the Fairytale House, the Schauspielhaus and the building of the "Alte Leipziger Versicherung" were built around Gottschedstrasse. For this purpose, the Pleißemühlgraben (Pleiße mill race) was also vaulted in 1898/99.

National Socialism led to the first senseless destruction. On 9 and 10 November 1938, the Leipzig Synagogue and the Ez-Chaim Synagogue were destroyed. The latter was donated by Chaim Eitingon and opened in 1922 as the second largest synagogue in the city. Numerous Stolpersteins that have been laid today bear witness to a lively Jewish life in the former Innere Westvorstadt. By the Bombing of Leipzig in World War II, the central and southern parts of the neighbourhood were over the whole area destroyed and, by Leipzig standards, very badly.

== After 1945 ==
Reconstruction after 1945 progressed slowly. In 1954/55, the former Centraltheater was initially redesigned as Schauspiel Leipzig. Some plans for comprehensive demolition or a main thoroughfare across the neighbourhood, as they appear in some concepts of the 1950s, were not implemented. Rather, the first housing cooperatives residential buildings were built between 1958 and 1960, in the vicinity of which the old Promenadenstrasse (now Käthe-Kollwitz-Strasse) and Westplatz were relocated in 1960/62. The part close to the centre hardly changed until the 1980s. A renovation concept from 1982 finally provided for the experimental renovation of the remaining old buildings and the construction of prefabricated buildings in between in the old streets. The new development, which was completed in 1990, still characterises the Kolonnadenviertel today with bay windows, loggias and ornamented facades. Kolonnadenstrasse was one of the state's flagship streets in the last years of the GDR. Today, many artists have settled there.

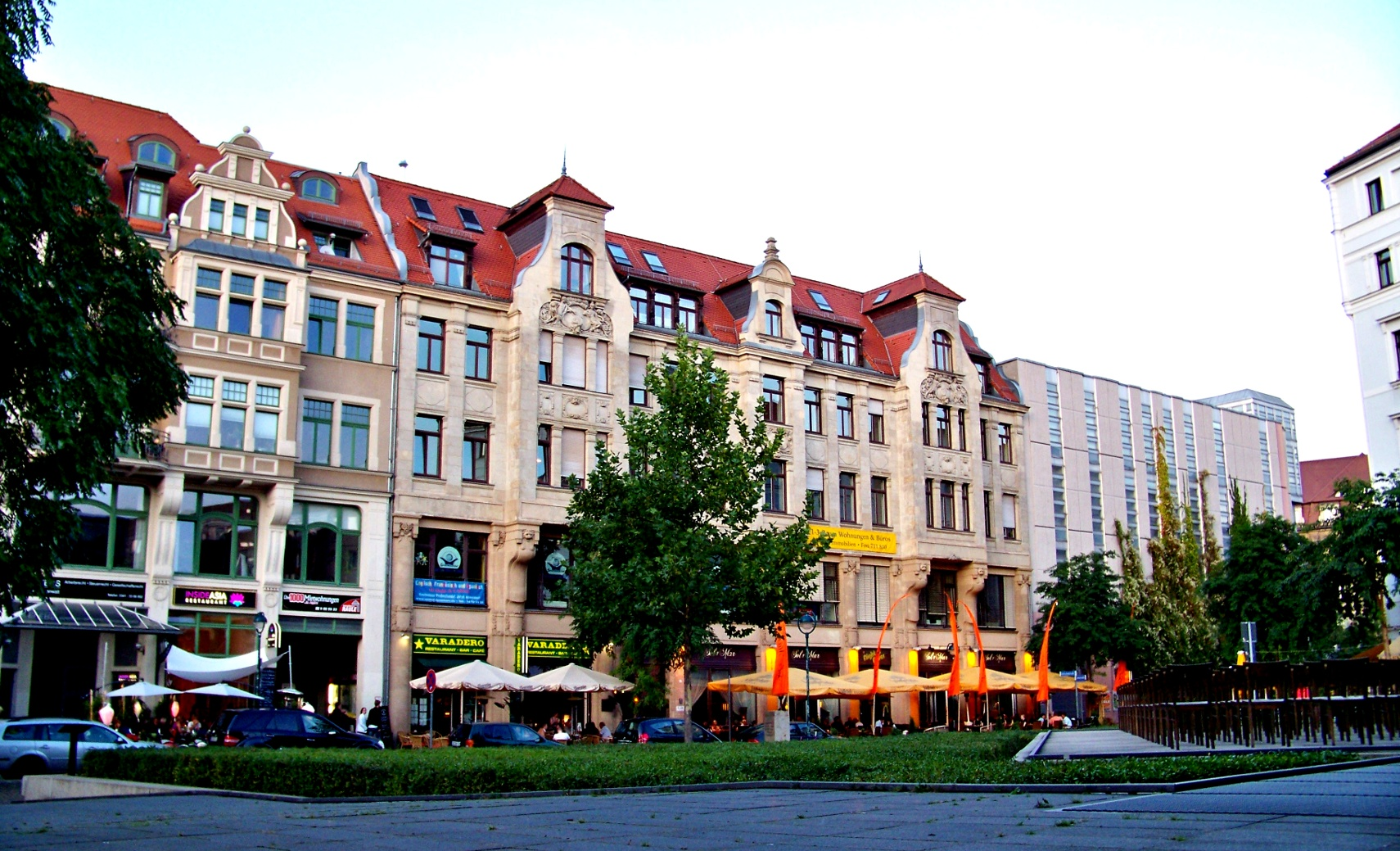
Pub mile Gottschedstrasse

The remaining old buildings, especially in the northern part, were renovated from 1990 onwards. The factory complex of VEB Drahtchemie on Zimmerstrasse, located in the middle of the neighourhood, was shut down and replaced in 1995–97 by the postmodern new building "Dorotheenhof" designed by the Florentine architect Adolfo Natalini. At the same time, the Dresdner Bank (later Commerzbank) had a large office complex built between the Inner City Ring Road and Zentralstrasse. Other remaining gaps between buildings were also closed by new residential and commercial buildings during this time. In the 1990s, Gottschedstrasse developed into a popular "pub mile" with a well-developed restaurant and associated "outdoor seating" on the sidewalks.

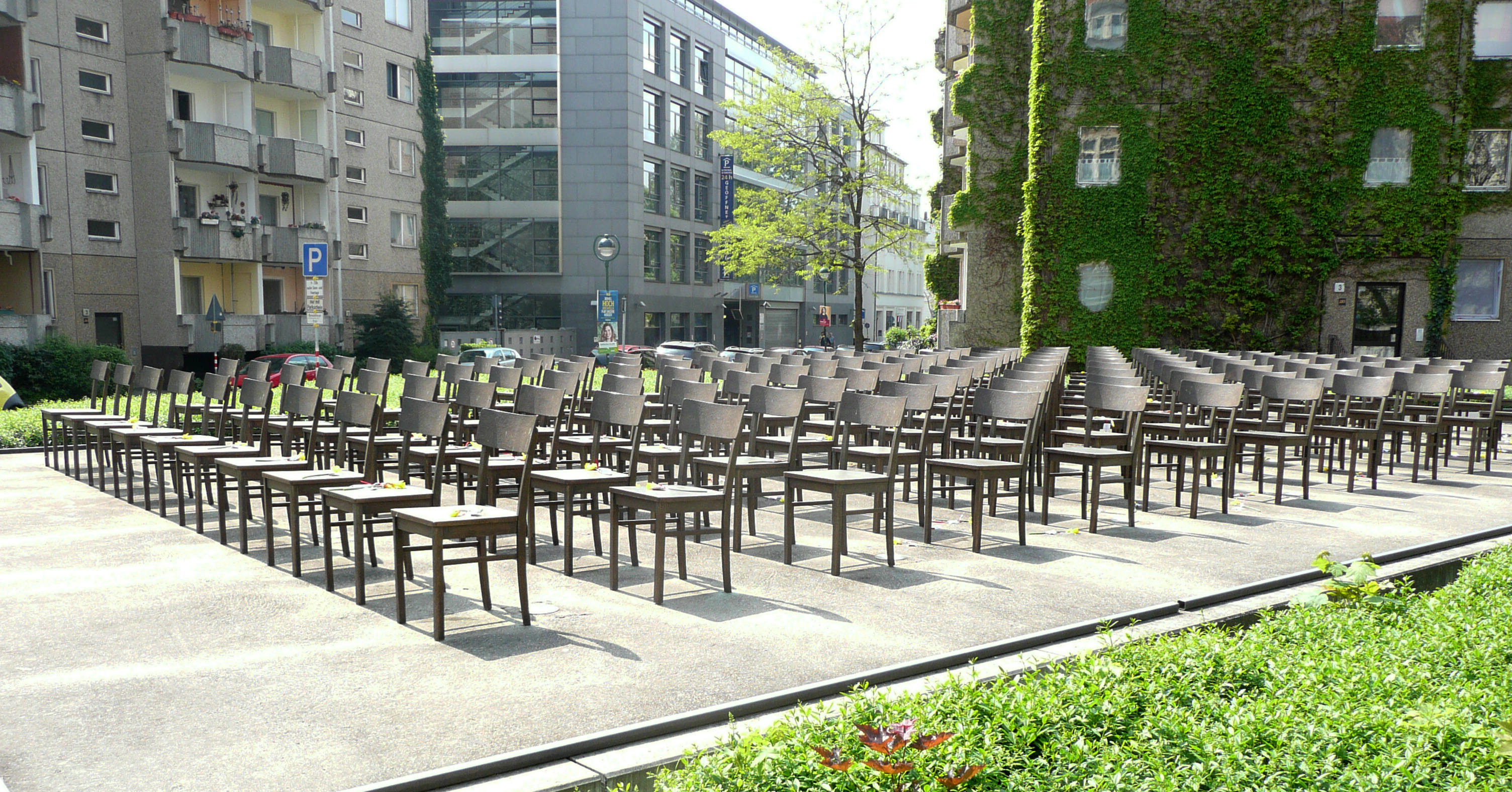
Memorial to the Leipzig Synagogue

The previously arched water body of the Pleißemühlgraben south of Gottschedstrasse was brought back to light in 1997. In order to cope with the lack of parking space, a five-storey car park was built in 1998 between the Alter Amtshof and Otto-Schill-Strasse. Since 2001, a striking memorial has commemorated the destroyed Leipzig Synagogue, which traces the floor plan of the destroyed building, on which 140 empty bronze chairs stand, over an area of 12 by 12 metres (39 ft × 39 ft). The former headquarters of the insurance company Alte Leipziger Versicherung on the Ring Road, which served as the "House of German-Soviet Friendship" during the GDR era, has been used as the second building of the "Felix Mendelssohn Bartholdy" University of Music and Theatre since its renovation in 2002. The number of inhabitants of the Innere Westvorstadt rose from 4440 in 2000 to about 6200 in 2014.

== Population ==
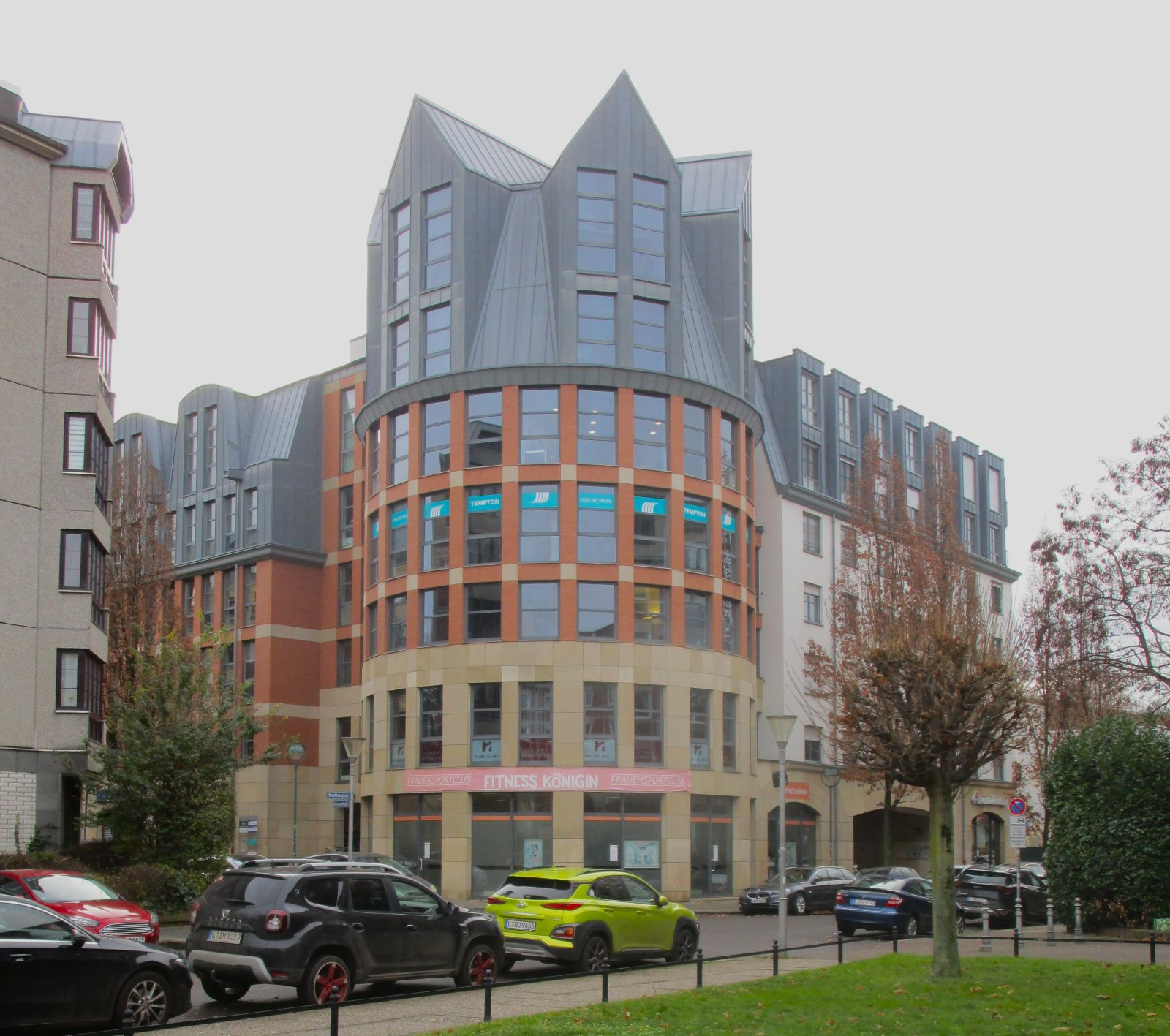
Dorotheenhof (2025), architect: Adolfo Natalini
