= Leipzig Synagogue =

Former synagogue in Leipzig, Germany

- German: Große Gemeindesynagoge
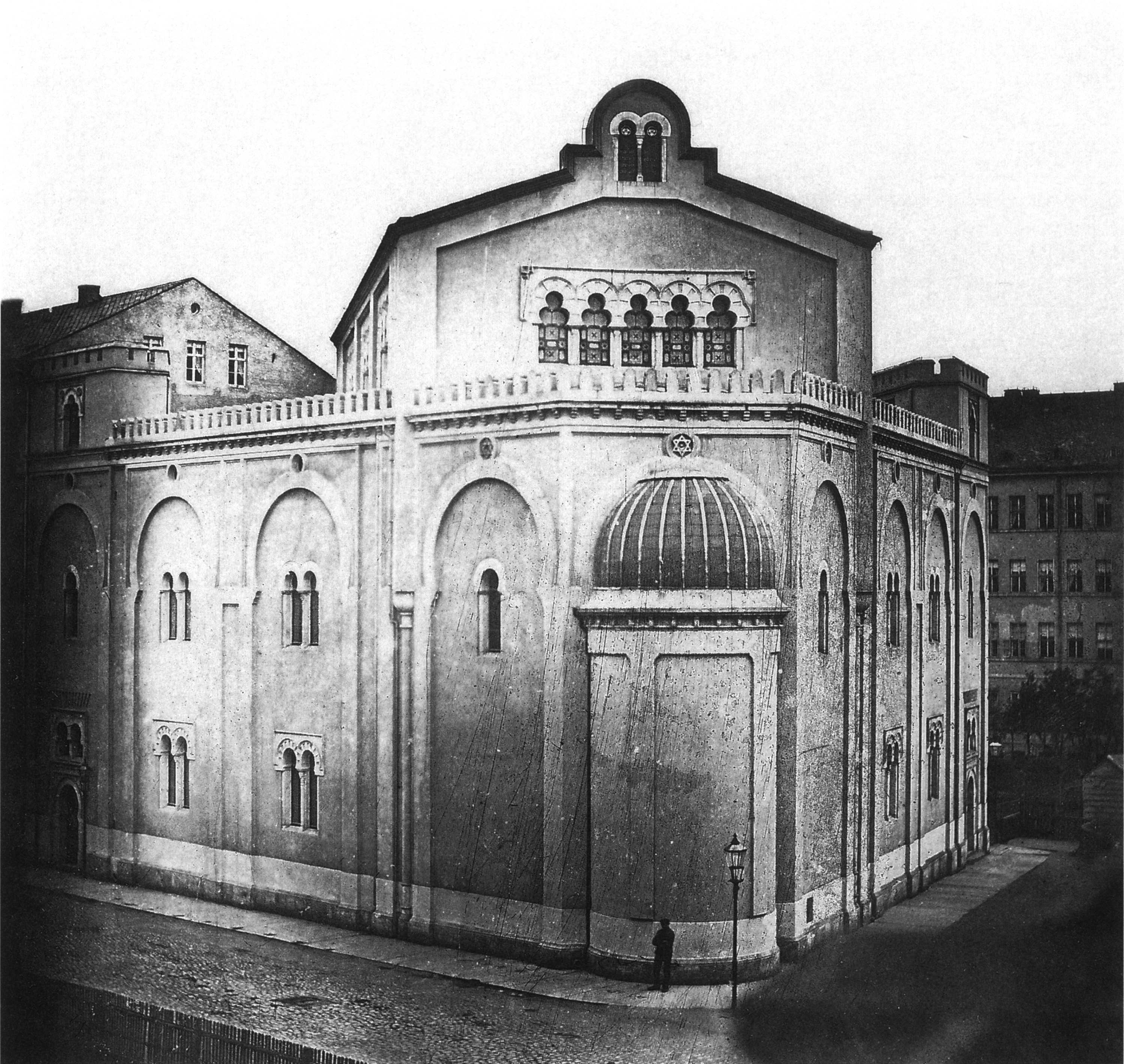
- The former synagogue, c. 1860

- Location of the destroyed synagogue in Saxony

Religion
- Affiliation: Judaism (former)
- Ecclesiastical or organizational status: Synagogue (1855–1938)
- Status: Destroyed

Location
- Location: Leipzig, Saxony
- Country: Germany
- Interactive map of Leipzig Synagogue
- Coordinates: 51°20′24″N 12°22′11″E

Architecture
- Architect: Otto Simonson
- Type: Synagogue architecture
- Style: Moorish Revival
- Completed: 1855
- Destroyed: November 9, 1938 (on Kristallnacht)

The Leipzig Synagogue (German: Große Gemeindesynagoge) was a synagogue, located in Leipzig, in the state of Saxony, Germany. Designed by Otto Simonson in the Moorish Revival style, the synagogue was completed in 1855 and destroyed by Nazis on November 9, 1938, during Kristallnacht.

== Overview ==
The ornate Moorish Revival synagogue was built in 1855, designed by Otto Simonson, a German Jewish architect who had studied under Gottfried Semper. The synagogue stood approximately in the west of the inner city ring road on the corner plot Gottschedstraße 3 / Zentralstraße (neighbourhood Innere Westvorstadt).

The synagogue was commissioned by the small Leipzig Jewish community and by Jewish merchants from throughout Europe who gathered for the annual Leipzig Trade Fair.

The interior featured horseshoe arches, an Aron Kodesh in the style of a mihrab and a pulpit in the style of a mimbar. Because so many businessmen gathered in Leipzig for the fairs, the synagogue is thought to have influenced the decision to build Moorish Revival synagogues in other cities.

The synagogue was destroyed on Kristallnacht by Nazis, and was not rebuilt.

== See also ==
- Architecture of Leipzig
- History of the Jews in Germany
- List of synagogues in Germany (in German)
- Memorial to Jewish Citizens
