= In Mr. Lublin's Store =

Novel by Shmuel Yosef Agnon

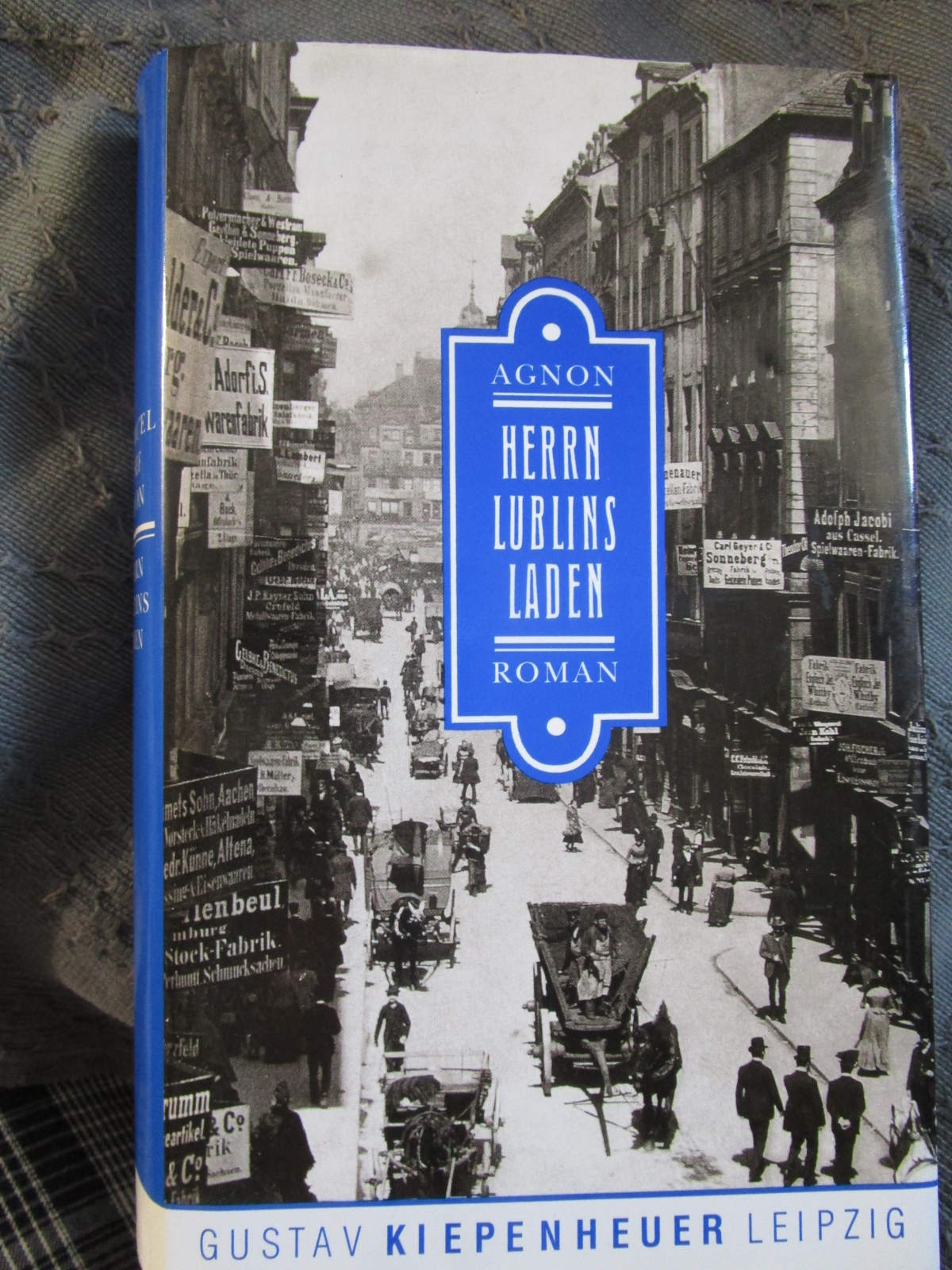
Cover of the German edition of "In Mr. Lublin's Store"

In Mr. Lublin's Store is a novel by the Israeli author Shmuel Yosef Agnon (1888–1970, Nobel Prize in Literature 1966). He describes the thoughts of a first-person narrator who arrived in Leipzig in 1915 about Judaism, his unnamed hometown in Galicia and his reception in Leipzig, while he is waiting for the return of his host Arno (Aharon) Lublin in his store in the city centre, located in a narrow alleyway named Böttchergäßchen.

The book was published in 1974 in Hebrew, in 1993 in German and in 2016 in English.

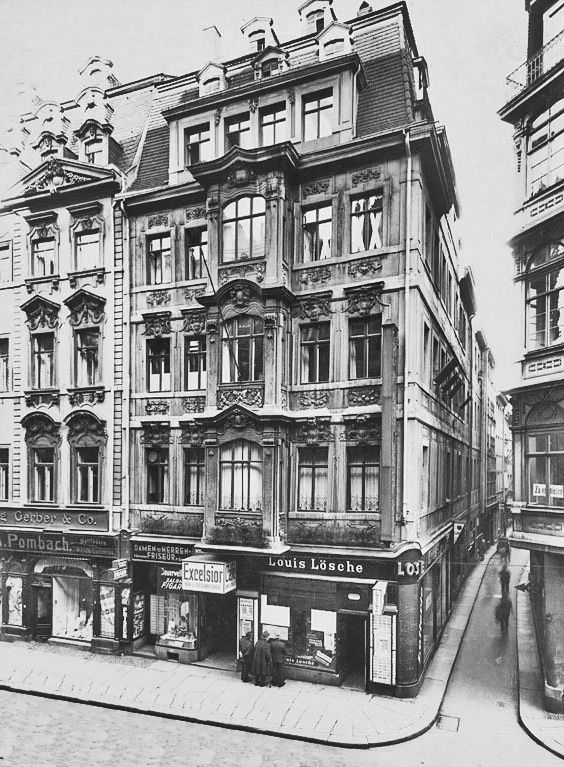
Access to Böttchergäßchen from Katharinenstrasse 1920

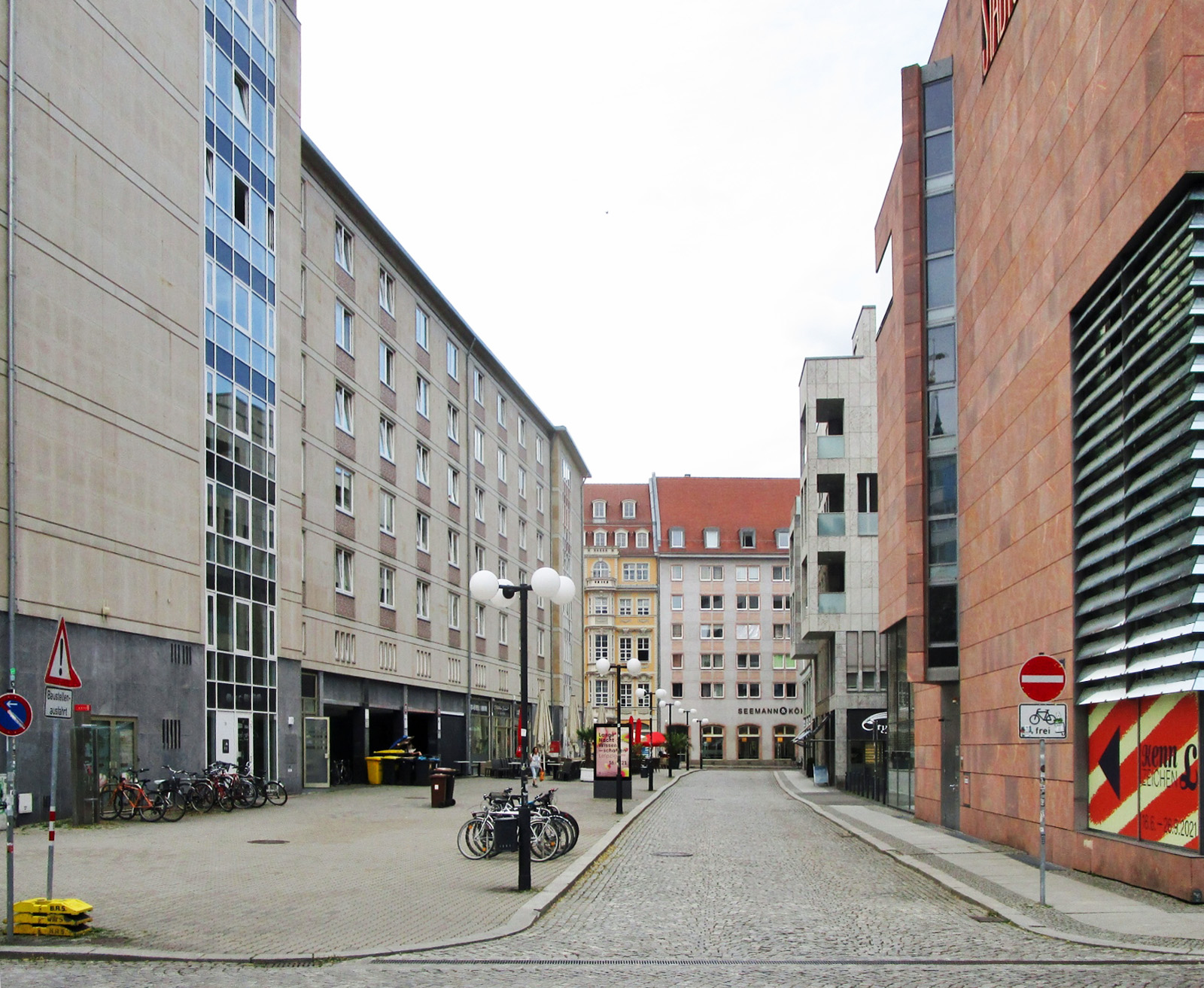
Access to Böttchergäßchen from Reichsstraße 2021

== Outline ==
The book is divided into 8 consecutively numbered chapters with consecutively numbered sub-chapters. It has no plot but follows the stream of thoughts of the nameless first-person narrator, a young man from Galicia who last lived in Jaffa and came to Germany in the middle of World War I. He wants to write a thesis on clothing in Berlin. He soon gives that up and follows the attraction of a famous rabbi and Mr. Lublin's invitation to Leipzig.

In the first chapter you get to know Lublin and its shop through the eyes of the newcomer. Lublin, away from home at the age of 11, has been in Leipzig since the 1870s.

The second chapter deals with obtaining the residence permit through Lublin's intercession with the official Dr. Paul Bötticher in the New Town Hall of Leipzig. Lublin's store is located in a building complex bought by Lublin near Leipzig's marketplace called Böttcherhof. The houses are over 300 years old at this point. Contrary to the usual practice in Leipzig, the new owner does not tear them down and does not replace them with new buildings. He leaves 4 small shop owners in the shops inherited from their fathers, even if they have no sales and pay no rent.

In the third chapter, two of these small shopkeepers, Witzelrode (antiques) and Götz Weigel (knife sharpener) and the history of their families are presented.

The fourth chapter is about Jakob Weinroot's shop (leather goods) and the history of his family.

Adam Isbas follows in the fifth chapter. His store is empty. Before the war he sold toys. Now he doesn't sell anything anymore, since only war toys are in demand, which Adam Isbas refuses. One of his customers was Frau Salzmann, a Jewish café owner whose young son had already died in the war.

In the sixth chapter, the first-person narrator catalogs Hebrew books in the very well stocked bookstore Haus für Orientalische Sprachen in Leipzig and, out of boredom, reads the goods catalog and the telephone book in Lublin's store.

In the seventh chapter, two very different young women are introduced, as well as the restaurant owner Glückstock and his story.

In the eighth (and final) chapter, leaping through time and space, Ya'akov Stern, a character from the first-person narrator's hometown, appears in Lublin's store. Instead of the usual cigar in his mouth, he has dust in his suit and is getting greyer and greyer.

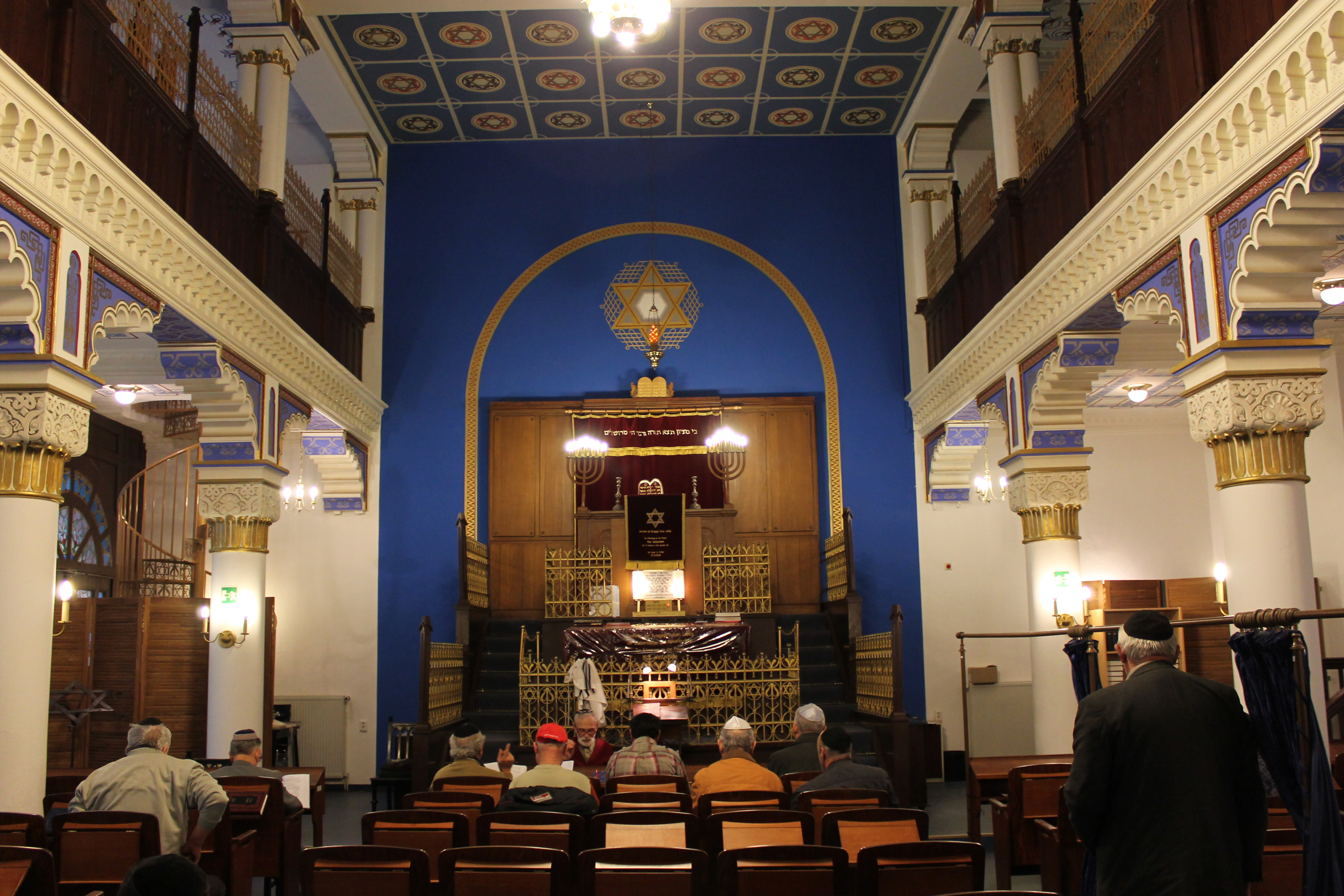
Brody Synagogue in Leipzig

== Themes ==
Leipzig is referred to as a big city in Ashkenaz. The latter has been the name for Germany in Jewish literature since the Middle Ages. For the Eastern Jewish migrants from Galicia (sometimes called Poland, sometimes Austria, sometimes Russia), Leipzig was an "arrival city" (Doug Saunders) at that time. As is shown by the example of several families, one goes there to escape from misery and because there is already a relative who can take one in.

Both the local color of Leipzig as a trade fair and trading city and the composition of Leipzig's Jews are described. There are said to have been three tendencies: the liberals, the orthodox and the people from Galicia, Poland, Lithuania and Romania. It runs through the book that the Jews supported Germany more unconditionally in the war than the non-Jews. This is what it says about the Salzmanns' son: "He went to war for love of his homeland, although he had not yet reached the age required for service in the army".

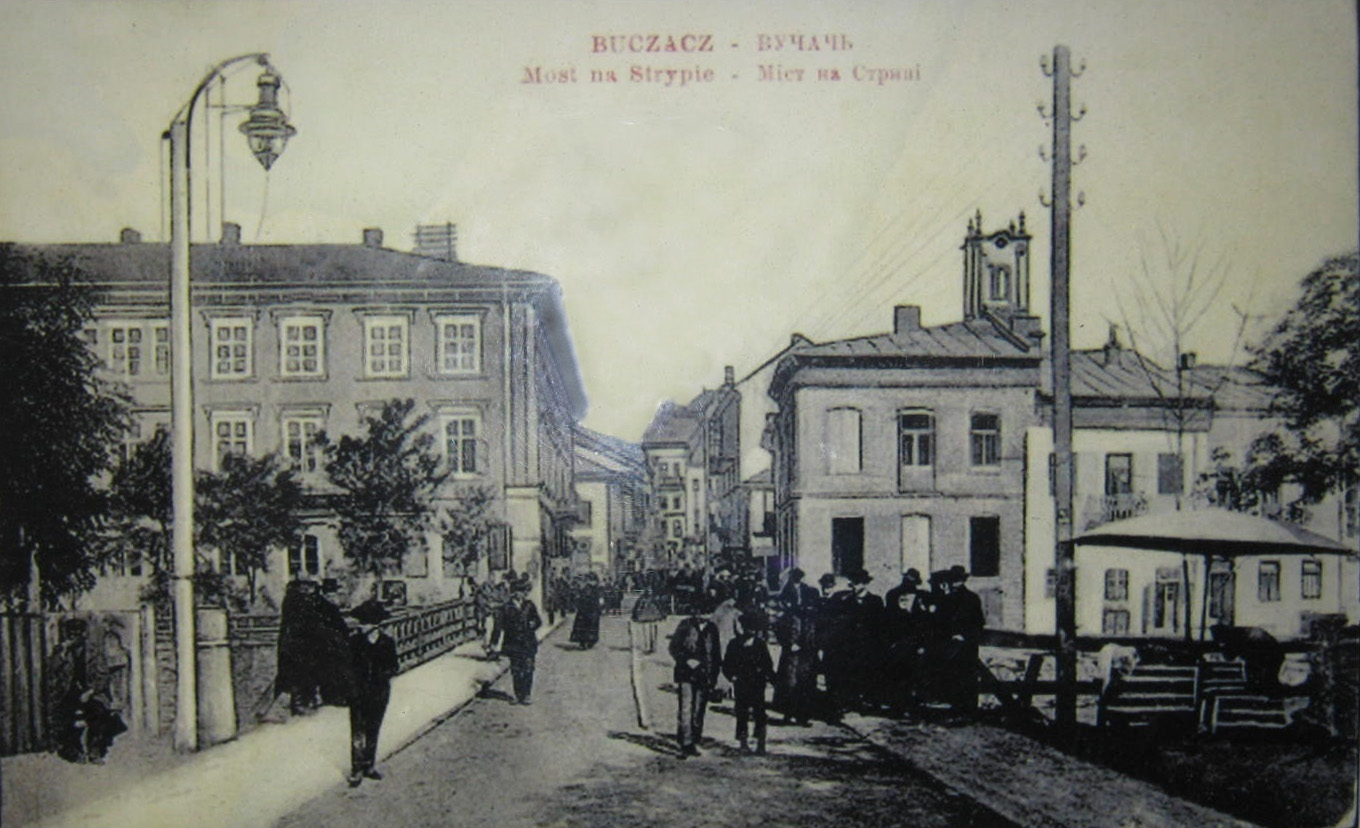
Buczacz, Agnon's hometown: the bridge over the Strypa is mentioned in the novel

The author's critical attitude towards the war is made clear by the exaggerations of patriotism. The good reputation of the "Leipzig goods" also becomes an anachronism, because "now there are only substitute products". The old men are at a distance and already seem to live in another world. "I compared the shops to tombs and their owners to scrawny skeletons". At the end of chapter 7, the young first-person narrator, alone in Lublin's store, has a vision that walls are growing and that he will be transported to his hometown.

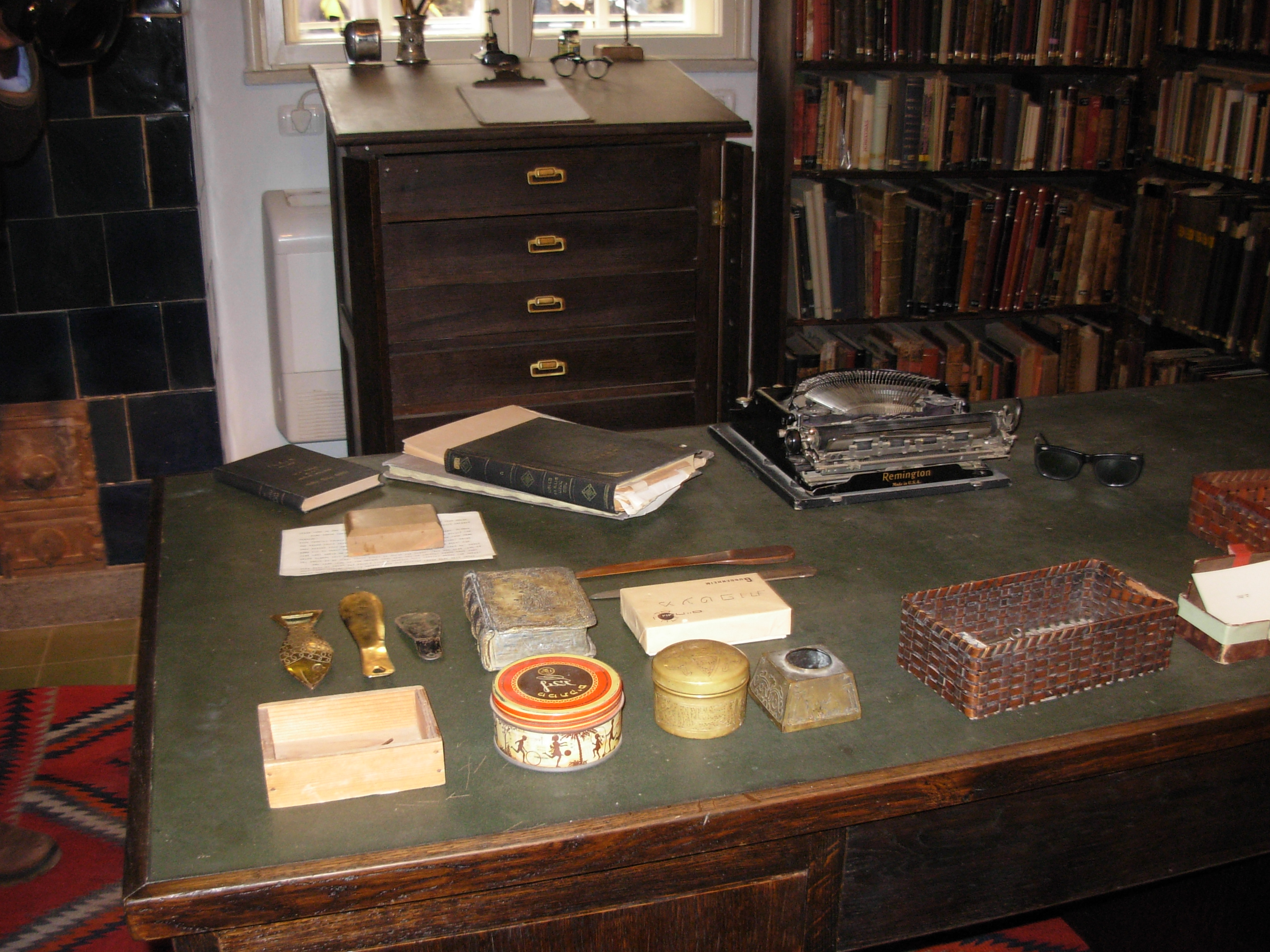
Desk of the author, Shmuel Agnon

== Style ==
Agnon uses with the stream of thoughts a stylistic device of classical modernism in this work with little action. The spelling is not realistic, rather there are surreal elements. Anachronisms are emphasized, space and time are not linear. The book has autobiographical elements. Written with knowledge of the extermination of the Jews to come, it is all in all an astonishingly friendly discussion of Germany and the city of Leipzig. Even considering the mention that the benefactor Paul Bötticher later turned into the villain Paul de Lagarde.

== Historical reference ==
Samuel Agnon stayed in Germany from 1915 to 1924. There was a strong Jewish community in Leipzig at that time: "In the mid-1920s, Leipzig's Jewish community had tripled in size since 1890 due to a large influx of people from Russia, Poland and Galicia, and now embodies one of the largest Jewish communities with over 13,000 members in Germany." Today's Böttchergäßchen (revived in 2001) is 70 feet further south than the historic one. It is documented that "the area between the Old Town Hall and Brühl remained almost untouched of structural changes", before it was destroyed. After World War II, it had to give way to the newly created Sachsenplatz in the GDR years, which no longer exists today and has been developed with the Museumsquartier Leipzig.

== Reviews ==
- Aaron Leibel (2017-01-05). "Agnon's In Mr. Lublin's Store a mishmash of merchanise". Washington Jewish Week.
- Masha Itzhaki, Polyphony of Voices and Languages : on the Question of Multicultural Israeli Identity. S. Y. Agnon and Avoth Yeshurun © Presses de l'Institut national des langues et civilisations orientales, Paris 2018
- Clara Ehrenwerth (2019-04-09). "Bildungslücke – Folge 7 – Schmu'el Josef Agnons Herrn Lublins Laden (1974)". kreuzer online (in German). (Stadtmagazin Leipzig).
- Glenda Abramson (2019). ""Our Town": Mr. Stern and Buczacz in In Mr. Lublin's Store". Indiana University Press, Prooftexts, Volume 37, Number 3. pp. 528–552.
