= History of the Jews in Leipzig =

Coordinates: 51°20′43″N 12°22′25″E

Leipzig, a city in the German state of Saxony, has historically been a center for Jews. Jewish communities in Leipzig existed as early as the 13th century. Discrimination against the Jews of Leipzig was recorded as early as 1349 and perpetuated under Nazi influence. Despite mass Jewish deportations and emigration forced by the Nazis in the 1930s and 1940s, Leipzig's Jewish community began to grow again in 1945 and continues to grow today.

== Jewish life in Leipzig (pre-1933) ==
=== 13th century ===
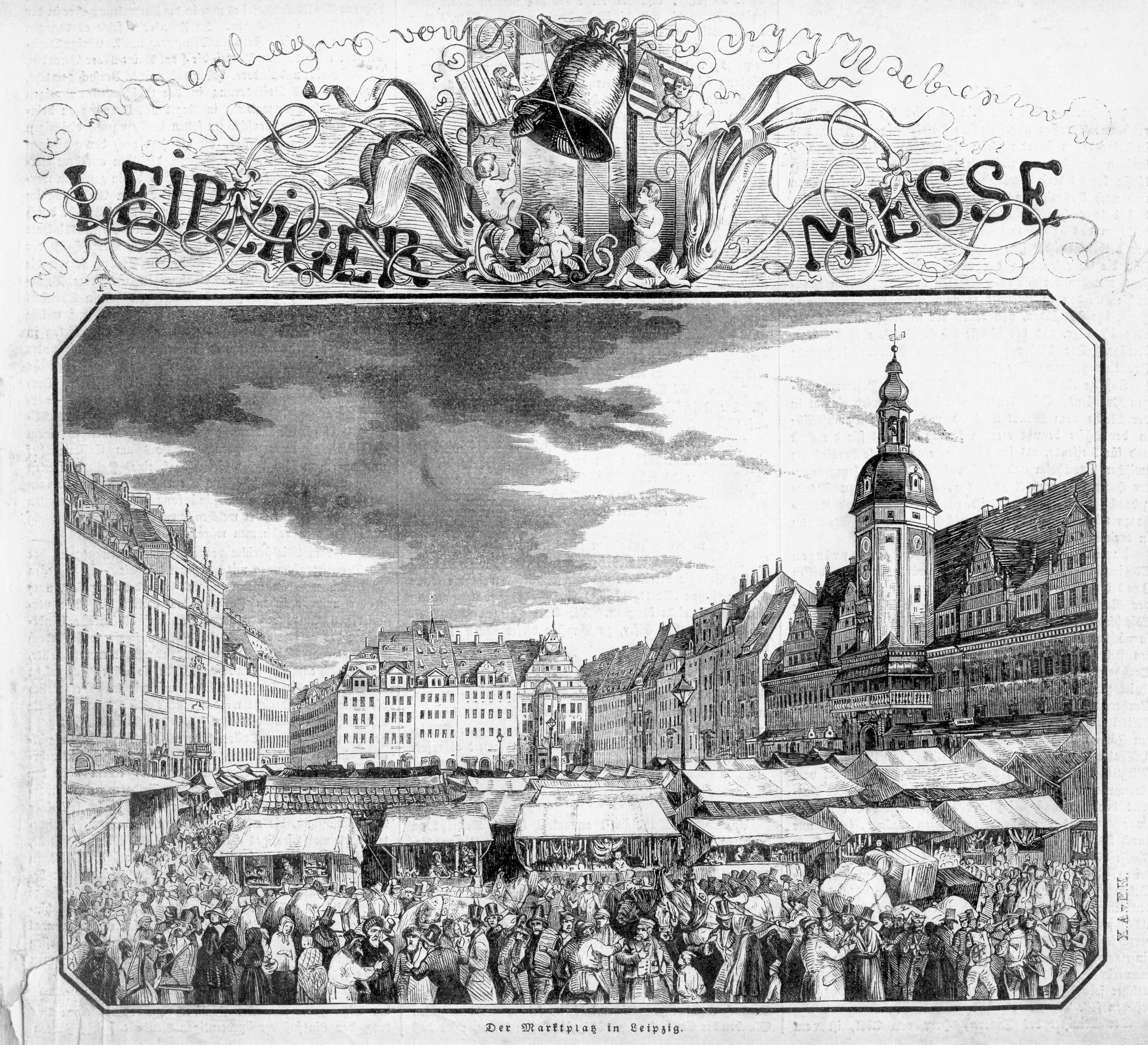
Leipzig Trade Fair

The first documentation of the existence of a Jewish community within Leipzig came from a collection of responsa between 1250 and 1285 that was compiled by Rabbi Yitshak ben Moshe of Vienna, the famous Isaac Or Zarua or Riaz. In one particular responsum, Rabbi Yitshak acts as an arbitrator in a dispute between his son-in-law from Leipzig and a Jew from another town. The documentation of his answer to the dispute indicated that the Jews of Leipzig already had a synagogue at this time, and their main source of income appeared to come from finance. Jews in Leipzig were generally respected at this time, largely due to their success in commercial trade. In 1248, Henry III, Margrave of Meissen published a document thanking Leipzig's Jews for their contributions to the commercial development of Leipzig. Leipzig's central location attracted Jewish traders from all over Europe to the Leipzig Trade Fair, an important fair that cultivated foreign relations among European nations and served as a meeting place for politicians. The Trade Fair regulations of 1268 reflected this as well, as Jewish merchants were granted rights equal to the rights enjoyed by Christian merchants, and the market day was changed from Saturday to Friday in respect for the Jewish Sabbath. The relatively relaxed merchant regulations made the Leipzig fairs very popular across Europe.

=== 14th century ===
As far back as 1349, the Jews of Leipzig began to face discrimination. In February 1349, Margrave Frederick "the Earnest" exterminated Leipzig's entire Jewish population by burning. Their residences and other belongings were confiscated. After the mass expulsions in the aftermath of the Black Death (1348–1349), eventually, Jews were permitted to return to Leipzig. For a short while, Jews experienced many rights and privileges they had before 1349. By 1352, a synagogue had been established in Leipzig. In 1359, records mention a Judengasse (Jewish Street) and a Judenburg (Jewish Town). The Judengasse stretched in front of the city wall along the Pleißemühlgraben (roughly at the level of Fleischerplatz). Jews were relatively safe in Leipzig at this time, and they did have some protections, but anti-Jewish regulations grew in prevalence and severity over time.

=== 15th century ===
By the beginning of the 15th century, Jews were faced with harsh regulations aimed to discriminate against their culture. Starting with a ban on public prayers within synagogues, the regulations reached a radical peak in 1430, when the Jews of Leipzig were expelled from Saxony, and their property was also confiscated. The Jews were still valued as merchants, however, as they continued to be admitted to Leipzig for the fair, but with many restrictions. They were not allowed to stay in Leipzig any time outside of fair days, every Jew who came to the Leipzig fair was required to pay protection many and present documentation issued by authorities, and they were forbidden from selling on the main streets or during Sundays and Christian holidays.

=== 16th, 17th, and 18th century ===
As Jews were, for the most part, only allowed short stays in the city between the 16th and 18th century, a permanent Jewish community was virtually non-existent. The Jewish presence in Leipzig consisted mainly of traders and merchants that remained only for the duration of Leipzig's Trade Fair. Between 1668 and 1764, 82,000 Jews attended these fairs, and played a major role in the development of Leipzig as a center for trade. Due to the overwhelming number of Jews temporarily staying in Leipzig during fair periods, many merchants established prayer rooms. An authorized synagogue, the Brody synagogue, was established in the Brühl, Leipzig, in 1763, and Jews taking part in the Fair stayed in the Brühl and the surrounding streets and alleys.

In 1713, Gerd Levi of Hamburg, a mintmaster and purveyor, was the first Jew to be granted citizenship in Leipzig since the event of February 1349. This was the first of what is considered the "privileged" Jewish households that were allowed residence in Leipzig. By the middle of the 18th century, the number of permanent Jewish settlements grew to seven, and by the end of the century there were roughly 50 Jewish merchants and their households living in Leipzig.

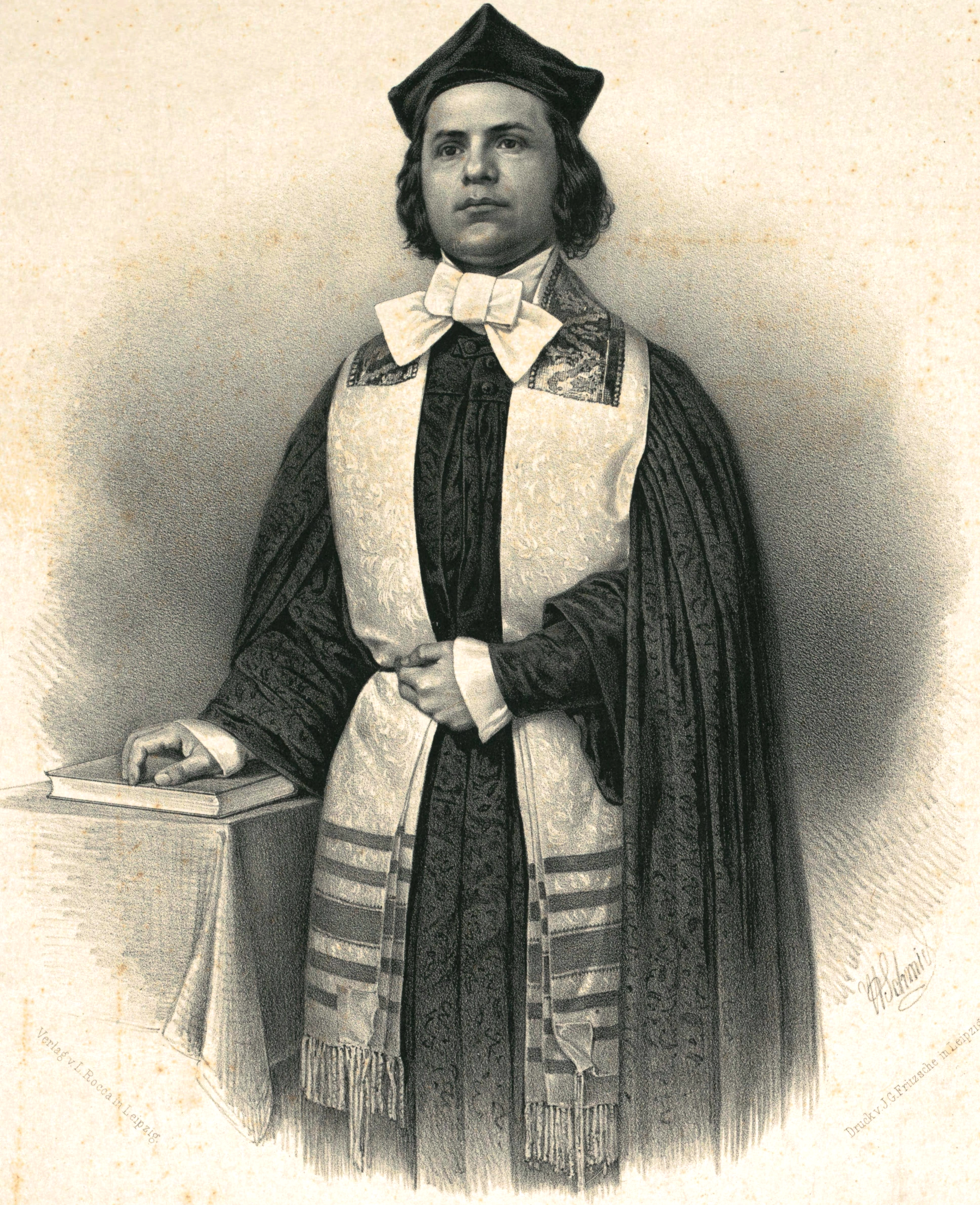
Adolph Jellinek, the first Chief Rabbi of Leipzig

=== 19th century ===
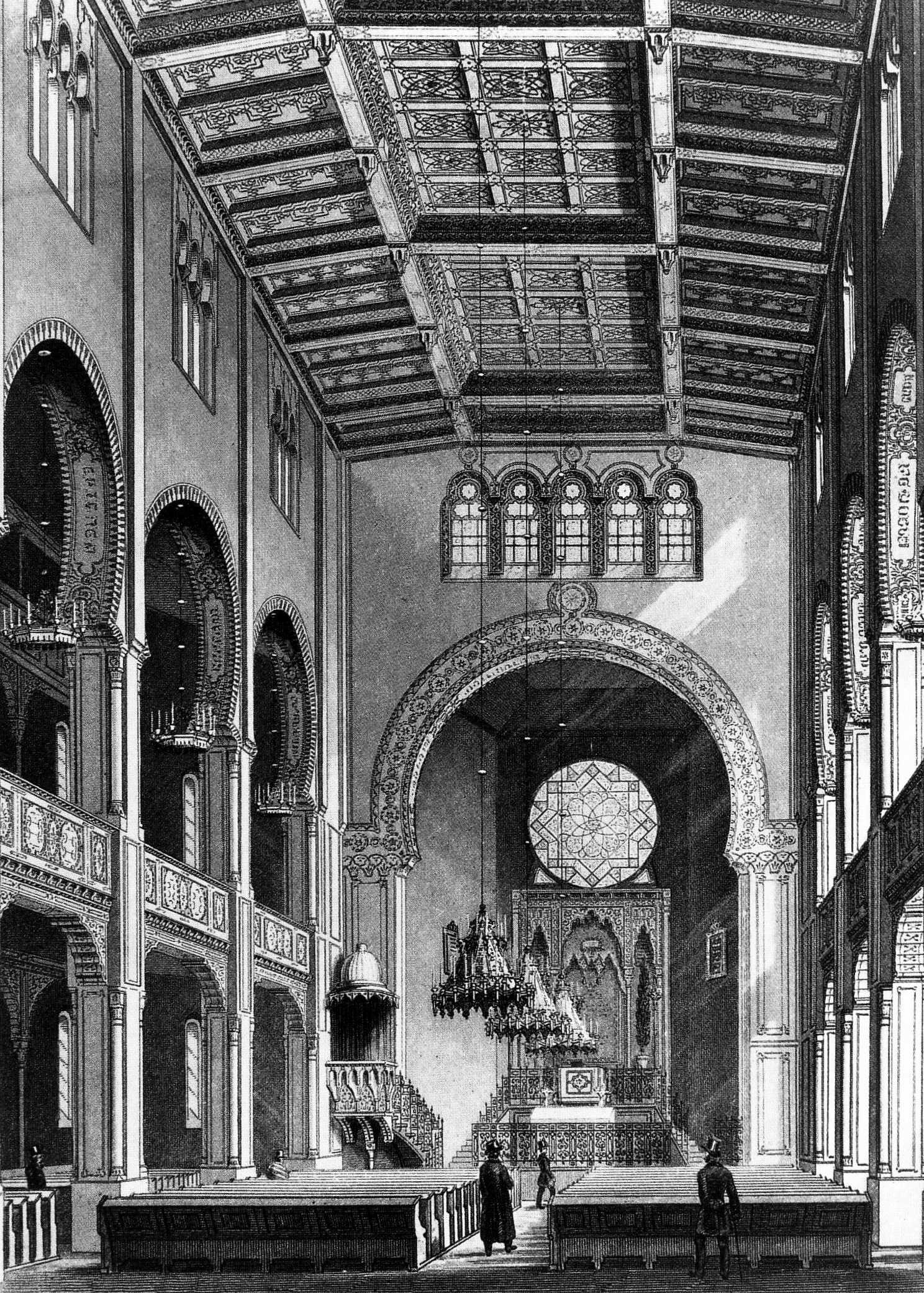
The old Leipzig Synagogue, before it was destroyed by the Nazi Regime on Kristallnacht

The beginning of the 19th century marked a revival of the Leipzig Jewish community. Starting in 1810, Polish Jews who came to Leipzig to trade were allowed to stay. From there, the Jewish community expanded. Jews were once again allowed to hold public prayer services, and in 1815 the municipal council agreed to open Leipzig's first Jewish cemetery. On May 18, 1837, Leipzig's growing Jewish community received permission to form a religious community, though their request for permission to build a synagogue was not granted. On August 16, 1838, they were granted civil rights, with the exception of municipal and political rights. During this time, Jews began to take a more active role in Leipzig's academics. In 1839, Julius Fuerst became the first Jew to lecture at the University of Leipzig. Leipzig Jews even served in prominent judicial positions during this time, like Martin Eduard Sigismund von Simson, who served as the president of the law courts in Leipzig from 1879 until 1891. However, it was nearly impossible for Ostenjuden, foreign Jews, to obtain Saxon citizenship. In order to do so, Ostenjuden had to be born in Leipzig and 21 years of age, or a resident of Saxony for at least thirty years. The Jewish community as an officially state-recognized organisation was established only in 1847 and only by then were Jews allowed to settle in Leipzig without any restrictions. Reform movements of the mid-19th century eventually led to the construction of the Leipzig Synagogue in the Gottschedstrasse in 1855, nearly two decades after Rabbi Zechariah Frankel attempted to found a Synagogue in Leipzig in 1837 and was rejected. The first Rabbi to serve the Jewish community in Leipzig was Rabbi Dr. Adolph Jellinek, who served from 1848 to 1855 and set the precedent of the Chief Rabbi's role in uniting the Jewish community of Leipzig. Towards the end of the 19th century, Antisemitism began to intensify. Several Antisemitic newspapers began to appear around this time, and the frequency of targeted harassment and discrimination against Jews increased.

=== Early 20th century ===
One Rabbi, in particular, that was especially prominent in liberal Jewish activism within Germany, Rabbi Dr. Felix Goldmann, assumed the role of Chief Rabbi of Leipzig in 1917. Rabbi Goldmann helped found the Jewish Agency for Palestine and Keren Hayesod, and he was also praised for his scientific work and works discussing Antisemitism. The Jewish community continued to grow steadily during this time. By the beginning of the 20th century, there were approximately 6,000 Jewish inhabitants in Leipzig. In 1910, that number grew to 9,728, and by 1925 Leipzig officially held the largest Jewish community in Saxony with 13,047 Jews. During this peak in the Jewish population, many Leipzig Jews were members of the upper-middle-class, which included businessmen, craftspeople, white-collar workers, physicians, and lawyers. The Jewish community of Leipzig established several programs to help the needy, and by the start of World War I there were 48 active charities. Various charitable institutions were opened during this time, including a Jewish hospital founded by Haim Eitingon in 1928, and a Jewish retirement home was established by the Ariowitsch family around the same time. The hospital has been called the Eitingon Hospital (Eitingonstrasse 12) again since 1992 and is under the administration of the St. Georg Municipal Hospital. As a result of the Nazi's rise to power, Leipzig's Jewish population decreased. The German Reich completed a population census on May 19, 1939, in which they determined that 0.5% of Leipzig's citizens were Jewish, where 4,470 were Jews by descent and 4,113 by religion.

== Nazi rule (1922–1945) ==
=== The NSDAP ===
The NSDAP created a Leipzig chapter in 1922, indicating the first Nazi presence in the area. The NSDAP regional administrative authority, along with the head revenue office and state police, were responsible for the implementation of Anti-Jewish policies. In the fall of 1939, the NSDAP created Judenhauser, in which Jewish residents and non-Jewish spouses of "mixed-marriages" were forced to live in close quarters. The majority of the 47 Judenhauser were located in the Nordvorstadt and the Waldstraßenviertel, bordered by Nordstrasse and Funkenburgstrasse. Families were constantly shuffled throughout Judenhauser, with some forced to move seven times in a year.

=== Emigration ===
Leipzig's Jewish community assembled a department to deal with the anticipated emigration of the city's Jewish families. The department worked closely with Palastina-Ami to ensure safe arrival to Erez Israel, and with Hilfsverein der Juden in Deutschland for emigration to all other countries. However, receiving the proper paperwork to emigrate was rather difficult for Leipzig's Jews. In order to obtain the necessary certificates, Jews had to be trained for specific types of labor in which their target country was in need of. Because many of Leipzig's Jews worked in business and the fur trade which was not needed in the country they wished to emigrate to, many of them enrolled in re-training courses where they learned blue-collar jobs such as bricklaying or carpentry.

=== Political life ===
The city's mayor from 1930 to 1937, Carl Friedrich Goerdeler, although being national-conservative, was a noted opponent of the Nazi regime in Germany. He resigned in 1937 when, in his absence, his Nazi deputy ordered the destruction of the city's statue of Felix Mendelssohn. In mid-1938, Jews were first banned from using park benches in the Rosental Park. By the end of the year, Jews would be banned from all public parks in the city.

=== First deportations ===
On October 28, 1938, Leipzig experienced its first large-scale deportation of fifty-percent of its Jewish inhabitants as part of the Polenaktion. Those considered as Polish nationals or stateless were to be deported, however the local Polish Consulate was able to shelter 1,300 Jewish Poles, preventing their deportation. The remainder was transported to the Polish border by railway and dropped in Zbąszyń, a forested area just across the border between Poland and Germany. Martin Kapel experienced this deportation first hand when he and his family were forced onto a crowded train, transported across the country, and forced to march into Poland following the lead of the SS. He notes that some of the prisoners on the march were too old to walk, others carrying children, and some were taken straight from their hospital beds. In accordance with a separate account, Zindel Grynszpan testified that he and his family were forced off of the train nearly a mile away from the Polish border. As the Jewish Poles/"stateless" headed toward the Polish border, SS men whipped them, and those who fell faced severe beatings.

=== Kristallnacht ===
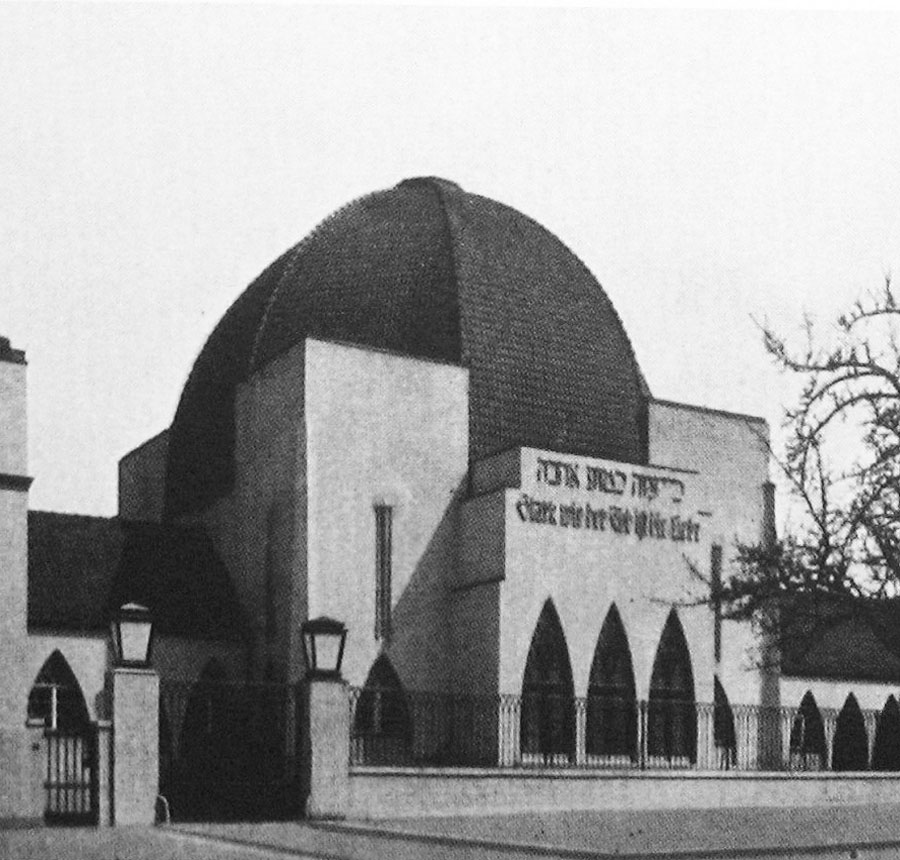
Severely damaged on the night of the pogrom: The mourning hall in the New Israelite Cemetery

On Pogromnacht in 1938, 553 Jewish men were arrested, centers of Jewish communal life were destroyed as well as one of the city's most architecturally significant buildings, the 1855 Moorish Revival Leipzig synagogue. In fact, three synagogues were bombed and their sacred records and objects destroyed. The Brody Synagogue and the mourning hall of the Jewish cemetery, built according to a design by Wilhelm Haller, were also damaged heavily on this night. Jewish tombstones were broken and graves exhumed, and of those exhumed, nearly 10 peoples remained unburied for nearly a week because many grave diggers had been arrested. Along with Jewish places of worship, Jewish businesses like Bamberger and Hertz were damaged during Kristallnacht. Additionally, the windows of the Brühl were smashed and costly furs stolen. Jewish properties not completely destroyed would be 'Aryanized' by the Nazis for the duration of World War Two.

=== The Holocaust ===
The deportation of Jewish Leipzigers began on January 21, 1942 until February 13, 1945 when the last 220 Jewish citizens were deported to Theresienstadt. In addition, Jewish Leipzigers who could not travel, like the elderly, were forced to live in Judenhauser. The Nazis wished to avoid the creation of a ghetto but did not want to have a scattered Jewish population throughout the city.

Meanwhile, Jewish men and women were deported from various German-occupied countries to subcamps of the Buchenwald concentration camp, operated in the city. The Leipzig-Schönau subcamp contained 500 Jewish female prisoners, whereas the subcamp at the local HASAG armaments factory held 5,000 female prisoners of various nationalities, a third of whom were Jewish. They were subjected to slave labour there, and sick and pregnant women and those considered unable to work were deported to other concentration camps. At the HASAG factory, there was also a subcamp for nearly 700 men, including Jews, who were mainly used to test the manufactured ammunition.

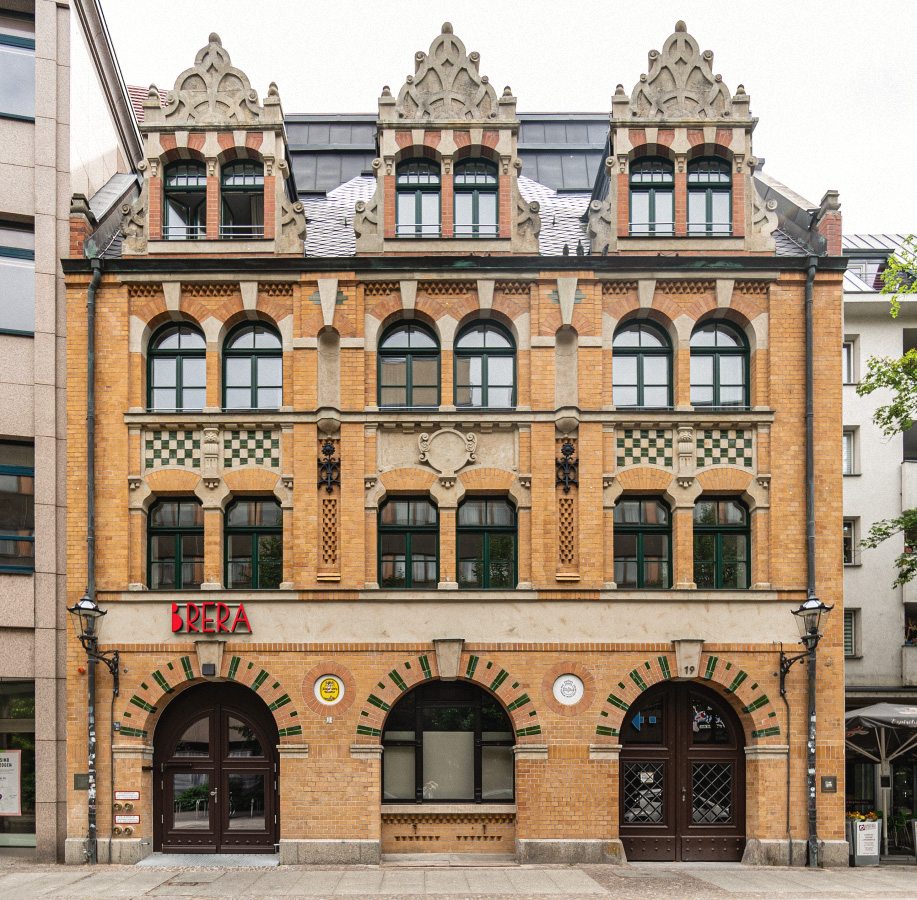
Große Fleischergasse 19, one of the two addresses of the Klemm Auction House (liquidated in 1951)

Following the deportation of Jewish Leipzigers, the German Revenue office visited the abandoned homes to confiscate any furniture, jewelry, and clothing that was left behind. These belongings were later sold by the Revenue office and the Hans Klemm Auction House for cheap prices to "Aryan" purchasers.

In February 1945, 180 women were deported from the Leipzig-Schönau subcamp to a subcamp in Bernburg. In early April 1945, over 1,000 women were deported from a subcamp in Hessisch Lichtenau to the Leipzig-Schönau and Leipzig-Thekla subcamps. On April 13, 1945, the SS sent most prisoners of local subcamps on death marches to other camps.

==== Post-WWII ====
In total, close to 2,000 Jewish Leipzigers were deported to Nazi extermination camps. By 1945 there were only 15 Jewish Leipzigers remaining in the city at which point 200 came back from Theresienstadt to form the Jewish community once again.

=== Aryanization in Leipzig ===
Aryanization of Jewish businesses during Nazi rule from 1933 to 1945 was intended to rid the economy of Jewish-German influence and cease the Nazi anticipation towards the "planned" destruction of Jewish-Germans. Newly implemented laws such as the Aryan Clause and the Nuremberg Race Laws classified Jewish-Germans as "racially inferior" and, as a result, the Nazi party was slowly vocalizing their most important goal; excluding Jewish citizens from the German way of life. Through racially biased economic policies, boycotts fueled by propaganda, and overall confiscation of Jewish property, the Nazi regime was able to exclude Jewish-Germans from business life and eventually from the general populace which, in turn, systematically drove Jewish emigration out of Germany.

==== The M. Joske & Co. department store ====
For almost 30 years, Michaelis-Max Joske ran two department stores in Leipzig, one on Windmühlenstrasse and a smaller one on Karl-Heine-Strasse 43–45 in the west of Leipzig named M. Joske & Co. During the April boycott of 1933, his two sons, Hans and Julius, who were acting managers and partners, were ordered to stand at the entrance of the store while they were taunted and humiliated. Activists intimidated customers and blocked the entrance to the shop. Additionally, on the windows of the M. Joske department store, as well as many other shops, anti-Semitic slogans were drawn. Due to this interaction between the two sons and the boy-cotters, the store's customers began to slowly avoid making purchases here and new customers were not taking their place. Eventually, due to this loss in revenue, Julius had to file for bankruptcy which resulted in the company being liquidated and sold at auction.

==== Deutsche Bank ====
On April 1, 1933, the day of the nationwide anti-Jewish boycott, after a year of pressure by NSDAP functionaries on the Deutsche Bank's supervisory board to dismiss Jewish members of the board, members of the NSBO demanded that Jewish employees be removed from the company. Following this confrontation, only a few employees received a termination of their contracts, but internal pressure was starting to bubble up beneath the board of members. As a result of this internal pressure, many Jewish-owned or operated branches and firms were purged or sold. In the end, more followed and between 1932 and 1935, Jewish-owned firms dropped from 100,000 to nearly 75,000. By the end of 1937, this number had fallen to only 33,000 currently operating branches. The demand for the firing of Jewish employees and board members was not the only way firms were "aryanized" or in which they aided in the process such as the Deutsche Bank. During this time, notably 1935–1940, state agencies had also been increasing the tax burden on such enterprises. Specifically, the rate of corporate tax was increased from 20% in 1935 to 40% in 1939–40. Additionally, a new supplemental tax (Mehreinkommensteuer) was introduced in early 1939 which added an additional 15% to profits that had increased from 1937 to 1938.

==== Leipzig fur trade ====
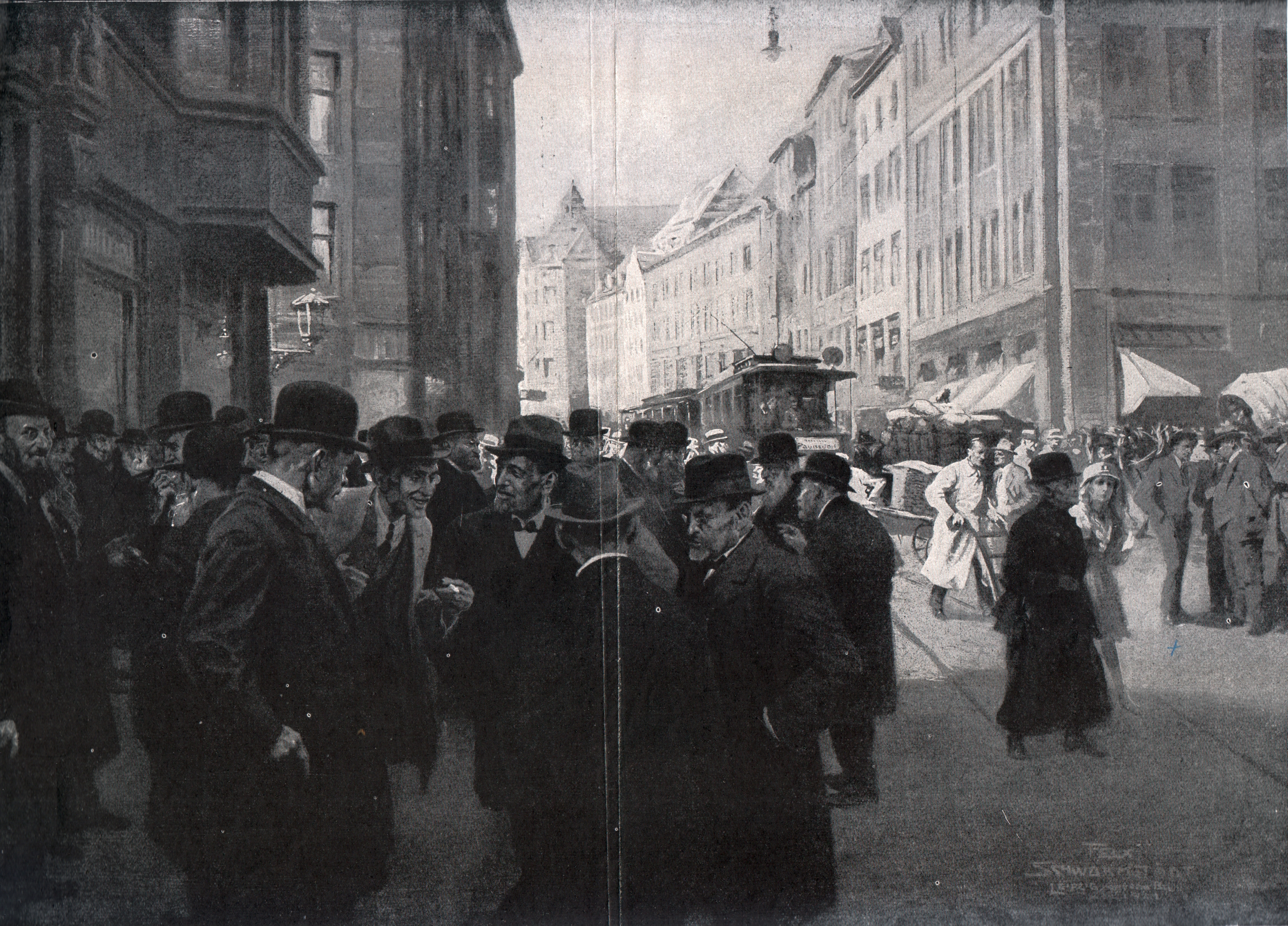
Leipzig, Auf dem Brühl, by Felix Schwormstädt, probably 1922

On the Brühl, almost ten percent of Leipzig's Jews were a part of the city's fur industry. Most of the Jews in the fur trading industry were of Polish descent, and the excellent quality of the furs turned Leipzig into a center for the industry, along with other centers in Europe such as Paris and London. Through the 1930s, businesses along the Brühl contributed to one-third of the world's fur trade. In 1933 when the Nazis began influencing politics, Jewish fur traders and their families in Leipzig suffered. The Nazis urged the public to boycott Jewish furs, which made it difficult for many Jews in Leipzig to make a living. Vulnerable on purely economic grounds, the Leipzig fur trade collapsed slightly before the Nazi crisis and during the world depression. During World War II, the removal of Jewish businesses and Allied push-back resulted in the decline of this industry.

While most areas which came under regular attack included banking and department stores, the garment/shoe trade and cattle dealing were also prone to attack for being "Jewish". In Leipzig, most of the trading took place in medium-sized specialty shops where its owners were regularly held responsible for macroeconomic forces such as drastic increases in inflation. Although these businesses were not subjects of the later systemic "aryanization" used by the Nazis in which legislation was the driving force, and, instead, were harassed, in the early stages, by party functionaries and competitors, they were often still sold or even destroyed by these factors. Along with the pressure from party functionaries and competitors, occasionally banks, such as the Deutsche Bank branch in Leipzig, began to cancel credit lines and liquidate debit accounts. Even though the termination of the Deutsche Bank's business contacts with the Jewish firms were not concretely "aryanization" and were not specific to the fur trade, such business contacts got only more sparse in the future and, in the end, management/ownership would eventually be forced to turn Aryan.

==== C.F. Peters music publishing house ====
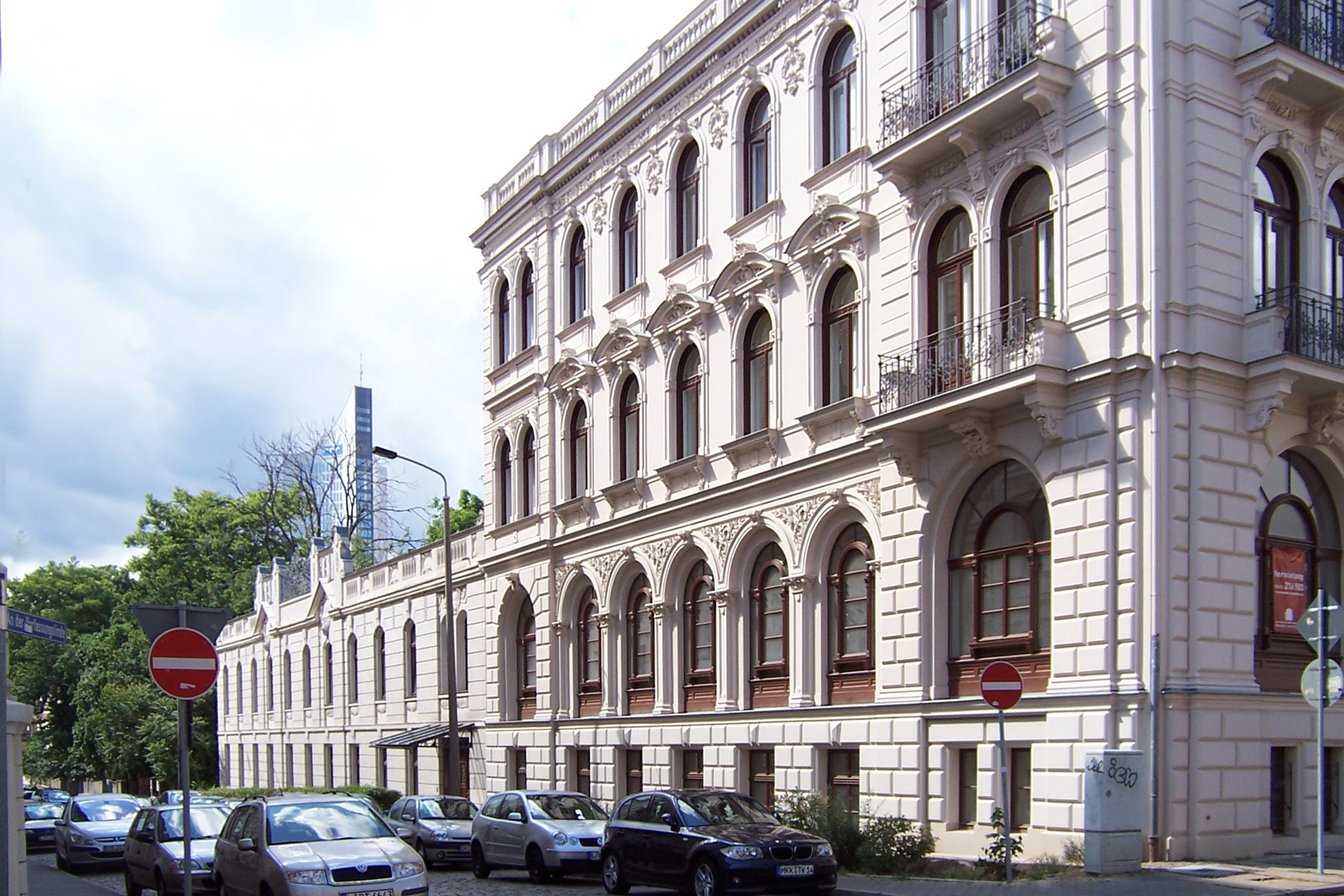
Former Building of Edition Peters (C.F. Peters) in Leipzig, corner of An der Verfassungslinde/Talstraße

The C.F. Peters Music Publishing House, built in 1900 and owned by Henri Hinrichsen, thrived in one of the leading locations for German music publishing; Leipzig. Henri, a successful businessman and philanthropist soon became a target of discrimination and exclusion carried out by the Berufs- und Standesorganisationen der Musikverleger (Music Publisher's Association). After many years of pressure and discrimination, only 17 approved "Jewish" music publishers still existed in Germany, one of those being C.F. Peters. On November 10, 1938, however, chaos reached an extreme as the firm's headquarters was ransacked and the music was burned. A little over a year later, on November 15, 1939, Henri and his son Hans were expelled and a forced "aryanization" of the company began. The process was executed by SS regiment leader Gerhard Noatzke and in July 1939, a sales contract was finalized and the property, along with its buildings such as the Peters Music Library, were sold for one million Reichsmarks. Henri, his wife Martha, and their son Hans soon unsuccessfully attempted to emigrate to the United States and instead, after his wife and son had died in Brussels and Perpignan respectively, Henri was deported to Auschwitz and later murdered.

Henri's other two sons, Max and Walter successfully escaped Germany and lived out their lives in London and the United States respectively. Max, the younger of the two, spent many years fighting for the recognition of his rights in the Peters catalog. Eventually, in 1951, they would be recognized by a High Court ruling and Max would go on to carry out the Leipzig tradition with his earlier founded Peters Edition Ltd.

Walter successfully emigrated to the United States in 1936 and would eventually establish C.F. Peters Corp. in New York. Here he would reprint Edition Peters titles and ultimately head a highly regarded publishing house. Only nine years later, Walter would return to Leipzig for company business matters now as a US citizen and US Army Music Officer.

==== Volksgut ====
Five years after the April boycott of 1933, in 1938, a newly enacted ruling authorized the liquidation of the Jewish segment of the economy. Essentially, Jewish assets were declared as "Volksgut" (German: Public property). Many large and internationally affiliated companies were finally caught in the "aryanization" process such as the C.F. Peters House. By the end of the next year, 1939, the German economy had essentially been successfully "cleansed" of Jewish influence and movements now shifted towards residential areas. In particular, Jews were beginning to be evicted from their homes and relocated in sections known as "Judenhäuser" (German: Jew houses). Two years later, in 1941, with the enactment of an edict and decree, the first by the Reich Security Main Office – RSHA (Reich Security Central Office) and the "Eleventh Decree to the Law on the Citizenship of the Reich" of 25 November 1941, Jews were prevented from emigrating out of Germany and were stripped of their German citizenship and the rights that went along with it; Jews living outside Germany were stripped of their citizenship. Confiscation of belongings and assets soon followed, and on January 21, 1942, deportations began in Leipzig to relocate Jews to newly marked Jewish homes.

==== Effect on Jewish population ====
Though most Jews were traveling merchants, in 1935 – less than a century after its establishment – the Jewish community in Leipzig consisted of 11,564 members, making it the sixth-largest Jewish community in Germany and the largest one in Saxony. Although Antisemitism was still prevalent, the community was thriving and uninfluenced by Nazi policies. The effect of Nazi policies in Leipzig is reflected in the significant decrease in Jews living in Leipzig from 1935 to 1939. The German Reich completed a population consensus on May 19, 1939. They determined that fifty-percent of Leipzig's citizens were Jewish, where 4,470 were Jews by descent and 4,113 by religion. The decrease in Leipzig's Jewish community from 1935 to 1939 may be attributed to Nazi persecution and emigration, however, the population is still significant in size at this time.

== Community services ==
=== Jewish community ===
Currently, Leipzig has the most active Jewish community in Central Germany. The one remaining synagogue to survive the war (the Brody synagogue) holds the only daily Minyan in Central Germany.

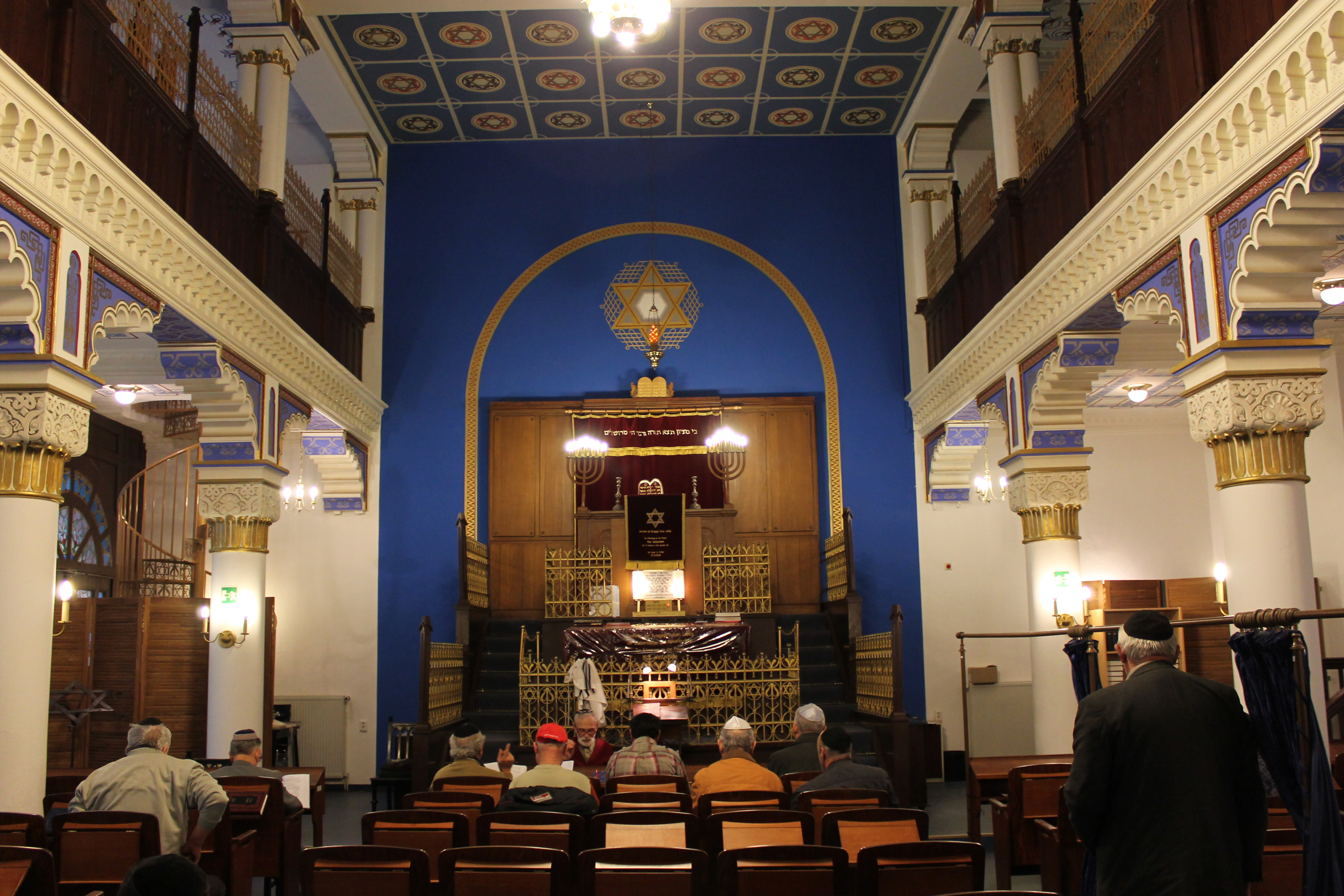
Leipzig synagogue

In 1989 the community numbered 30 members, but as a result of the immigration from the former Soviet Union, it began to grow. In 2012 the Jewish community numbered 1,300 members.

In 2026, the 15-member Beth Ez Chaim Lehrhaus, a Jewish study group that met in private homes, received its first Torah scroll on a 99-year loan from Kehilat Shalom in Gaithersburg, Maryland. The scroll was formally dedicated on October 4.

=== The Mikveh ===
In year 2006, a Mikveh for women was built.

=== Jewish cemeteries ===
In Leipzig there are two Jewish cemeteries. The NSDAP, head revenue office, and state police decided to tear down the old Jewish cemetery on June 30, 1937 stating that the area appeared "overgrown", and the entrance was blocked by rubble. Three hundred and thirty-four Jews were exhumed and reburied together in a large grave in the New Israelite cemetery. The old Jewish cemetery became a playground for "Aryan" children. The new cemetery has been used since 1927. In April 1972, construction began for the renewal of the celebration hall, together with the refurbishment of the religious-ritual space.

=== Kosher stores ===
In the community there is a Kosher store where people can purchase products that can not be bought in local stores such as meat, wine, cheese, and more. As of 2012 the local Gemeinderabbiner (community Rabbi), Rabbi Zsolt Balla, gives kosher supervision to one of the bakeries that comes to the Tuesday and Friday farmers market, so the community can benefit from Kosher bread.

In 2019, the kosher restaurant Cafe Salomon opened in Leipzig. It is the only kosher restaurant in Leipzig and the first since World War II. The cafe's menu is milchig, serving dairy and fish but not meat.

== Education ==
=== Early 1930s ===
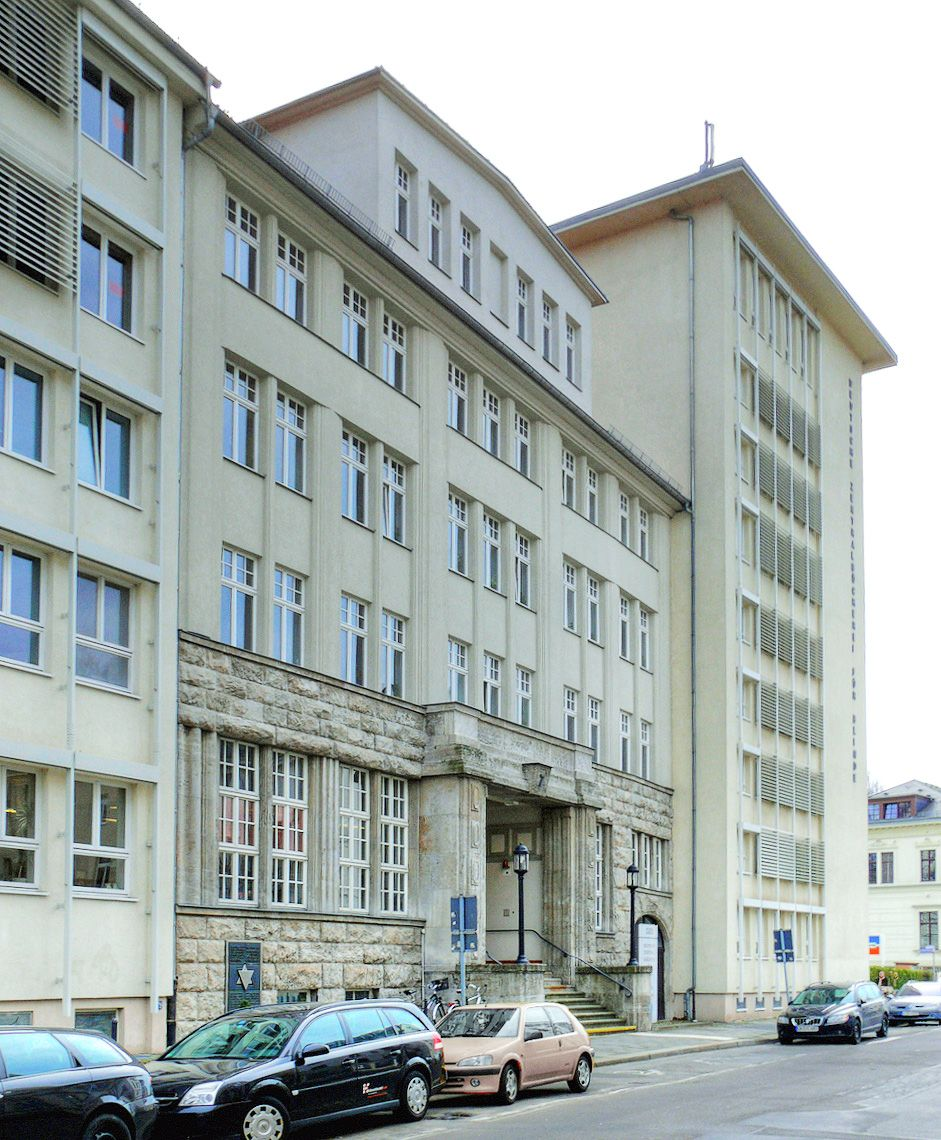
The middle building housed the Carlebach Schule (photographed in 2015)

Leipzig's schools either had the Carlebach Schule curriculum in which Jewish studies were integrated into other academic subjects, or non-Jewish schools. Holocaust survivor, Martin Kapel, recalls attending a non-Jewish school although he was raised Jewish. He remembers that his teacher often included Nazi propaganda in their academic lessons each day. At the beginning of each term and sequentially throughout the term, the headmaster of Martin's school would stand in front of the student body holding a large swastika flag and made a speech filled with Nazi propaganda. Following the speech, the children were expected to raise their arms in the Nazi salute and sing the German National Anthem and Horst-Wessel-Lied, a Nazi propaganda song.

In 1938, Jewish children were forced to leave non-Jewish schools and could only attend those taught by Jewish teachers. Because the schools were overcapacity, Martin Kapel recalls that he and many of his classmates had troubles focusing.

=== Current ===
For over 10 years there has been a Jewish play group and kindergarten in Leipzig run by the Leipzig Jewish community. The age range is between 2 and 6, at which point they go to first grade. In addition to the toddlers, Jewish students also have a Jewish infrastructure. In 2005 the Ronald S. Lauder foundation opened the Tora Zentrum, a place where Jewish students from Leipzig and the surrounding region can come in order to meet other Jewish students and learn about Judaism. The Tora Zentrum organizes weekly classes, Shabbat meals, and social events and activities for Jewish students between ages 18 and 32. In 2013 the Tora Zentrum changed its name to Nezach – Jüdisches Mitteldeutschland.

In year 2007, the Ariowitsch-Haus, a Jewish community center was founded. The Ariowitsch-Haus serves as a center for Jewish culture and heritage through holiday celebrations, Israel-related programming, and Jewish education for the general community.

Since 2011, Leipzig is twinned with the city of Herzliya, Israel.

== See also ==
- History of the Jews in East Germany
- In Mr. Lublin's Store
- Memorial to Jewish Citizens
- History of Leipzig
