= Joachim Ringelnatz =

German poet and artist (1883–1934)

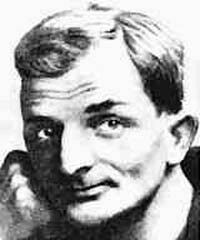
Joachim Ringelnatz

Joachim Ringelnatz is the pen name of the German author and painter Hans Bötticher (7 August 1883 in Wurzen, Saxony – 17 November 1934 in Berlin). From 1894 to 1900 he lived with his family at Gottschedstrasse 40 in Leipzig.

== Profile ==
His pen name Ringelnatz is usually explained as a dialect expression for an animal, possibly a variant of Ringelnatter, German for grass snake or more probably the seahorse for winding ("ringeln") its tail around objects. The seahorse is called Ringelnass (nass = wet) by mariners, an occupation to which he felt kinship. He was a sailor in his youth and spent the First World War in the Navy on a minesweeper.

In the 1920s and 1930s, he worked as a Kabarettist, a kind of satirical stand-up comedian.

He is best known for his wry poems using word play and sometimes bordering on nonsense poetry. Some of them are similar to Christian Morgenstern's, but more satirical in tone and occasionally subversive. His most popular character is the anarchic sailor Kuddel Daddeldu with his drunken antics and disdain for authority.

In his final thirteen years Ringelnatz was also a dedicated and prolific visual artist. The bulk of his art went missing during World War II, but over 200 paintings and drawings survived. In the 1920s some of his work was exhibited at the Akademie der Künste along with that of his contemporaries Otto Dix and George Grosz. Ringelnatz illustrated his own novel called "...liner Roma..." (1923), the title of which is a doubly truncated "Berliner Roman" (Berlin novel), for "Berlin novels usually have no decent beginning and no proper ending." ("Berliner Romane haben meist keinen ordentlichen Anfang und kein rechtes Ende.")

In 1933, he was banned by the Nazi government as a "degenerate artist".

Ringelnatz's widow Leonharda Pieper married Julius Gescher after Ringelnatz's death, and their son Norbert managed Ringelnatz's legacy and assembled a collection. Norbert donated the collection to the Joachim Ringelnatz Museum in Cuxhaven in 2019.

== Works ==
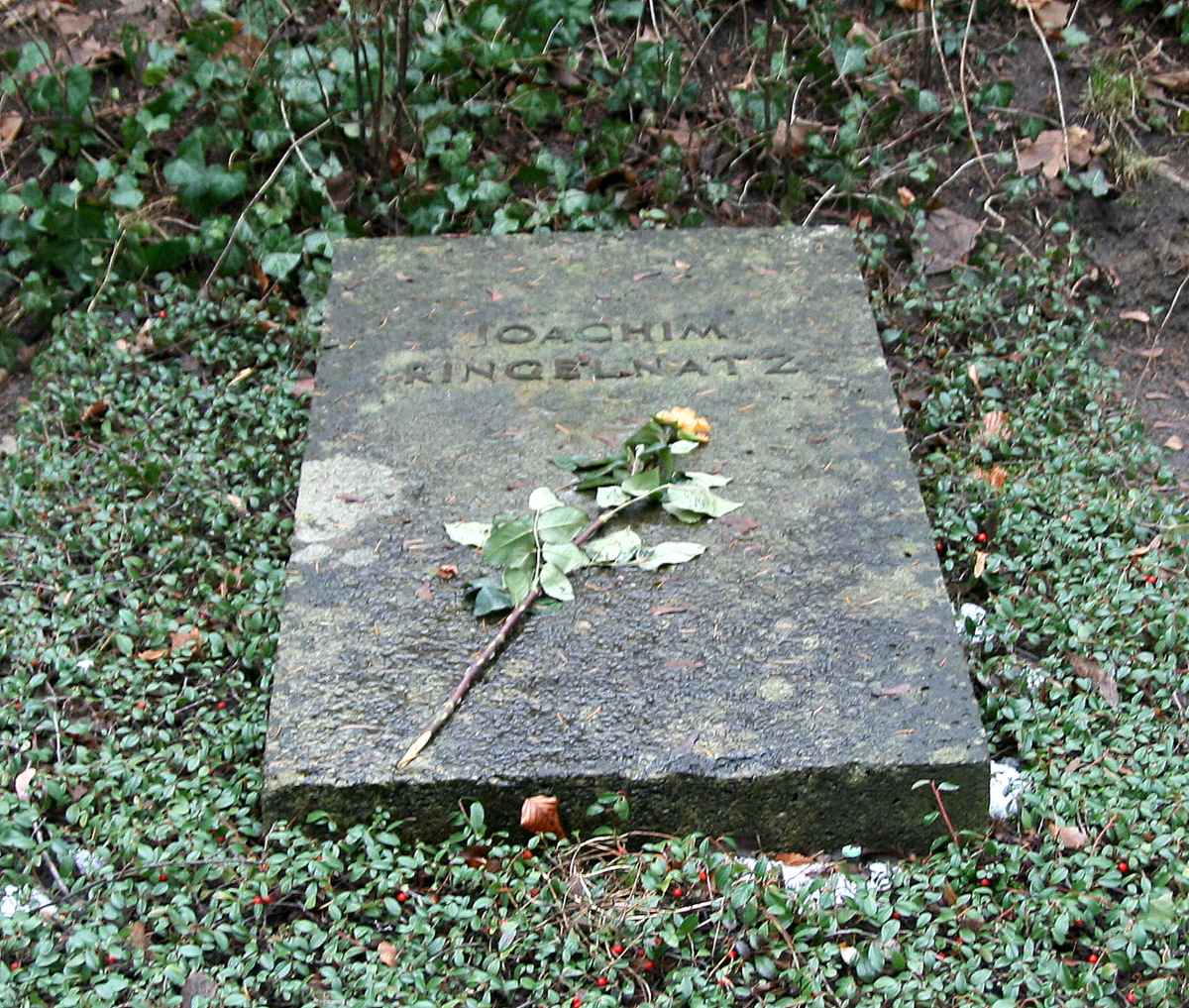
Tomb in Berlin

- 1910 Gedichte
- 1911 Was ein Schiffsjungen-Tagebuch erzählt
- 1912 Die Schnupftabakdose. Stumpfsinn in Versen und Bildern von Hans Bötticher und Richard Seewald
- 1913 Ein jeder lebt's. Novellen (digital reconstruction: UB Bielefeld)
- 1920/1923 Turngedichte
- 1920 Kuttel Daddeldu oder das schlüpfrige Leid
- 1921 Die gebatikte Schusterpastete
- 1922 Die Woge. Marine-Kriegsgeschichten
- 1923 Kuttel Daddeldu (digital reconstruction: Kuttel Daddeldu. Neue Gedichte der erweiterten Ausgabe, scans of a 1924 edition at the library of the university of Bielefeld)
- 1924 ...liner Roma... With 10 pictures by himself.
- 1924 Nervosipopel. Elf Angelegenheiten
- 1927 Reisebriefe eines Artisten
- 1928 Allerdings (digital reconstruction: UB Bielefeld)
- 1928 Als Mariner im Krieg (under the pen name Gustav Hester)
- 1928 Matrosen. Erinnerungen, ein Skizzenbuch, handelt von Wasser und blauem Tuch
- 1929 Flugzeuggedanken
- 1931 Mein Leben bis zum Kriege (Autobiography)
- 1931 Kinder-Verwirrbuch with many pictures
- 1932 Die Flasche und mit ihr auf Reisen
- 1932 Gedichte dreier Jahre (digital reconstruction: UB Bielefeld)
- 1933 103 Gedichte (digital reconstruction: UB Bielefeld)
- 1934 Gedichte. Gedichte von einstmals und heute

Posthumously

- 1935 Der Nachlaß
- 1939 Kasperle-Verse

Electronic Edition

- 2005 Joachim Ringelnatz - Das Gesamtwerk. The total work edited by Walter Pape is published on CD-ROM by Directmedia Publishing in Berlin, Germany, ISBN 3-89853-521-5

Most of Ringelnatz's paintings were lost during the Second World War; one of them at the Kunsthaus Zürich is not on display. The Ringelnatz-Museum in Cuxhaven, managed by the Ringelnatz-Stiftung (see below) shows many of his paintings. Most came from private owners, whose paintings survived World War II.
