= Gottschedstrasse =

Street in Leipzig, Germany

Coordinates: 51.3407°N 12.368288°E

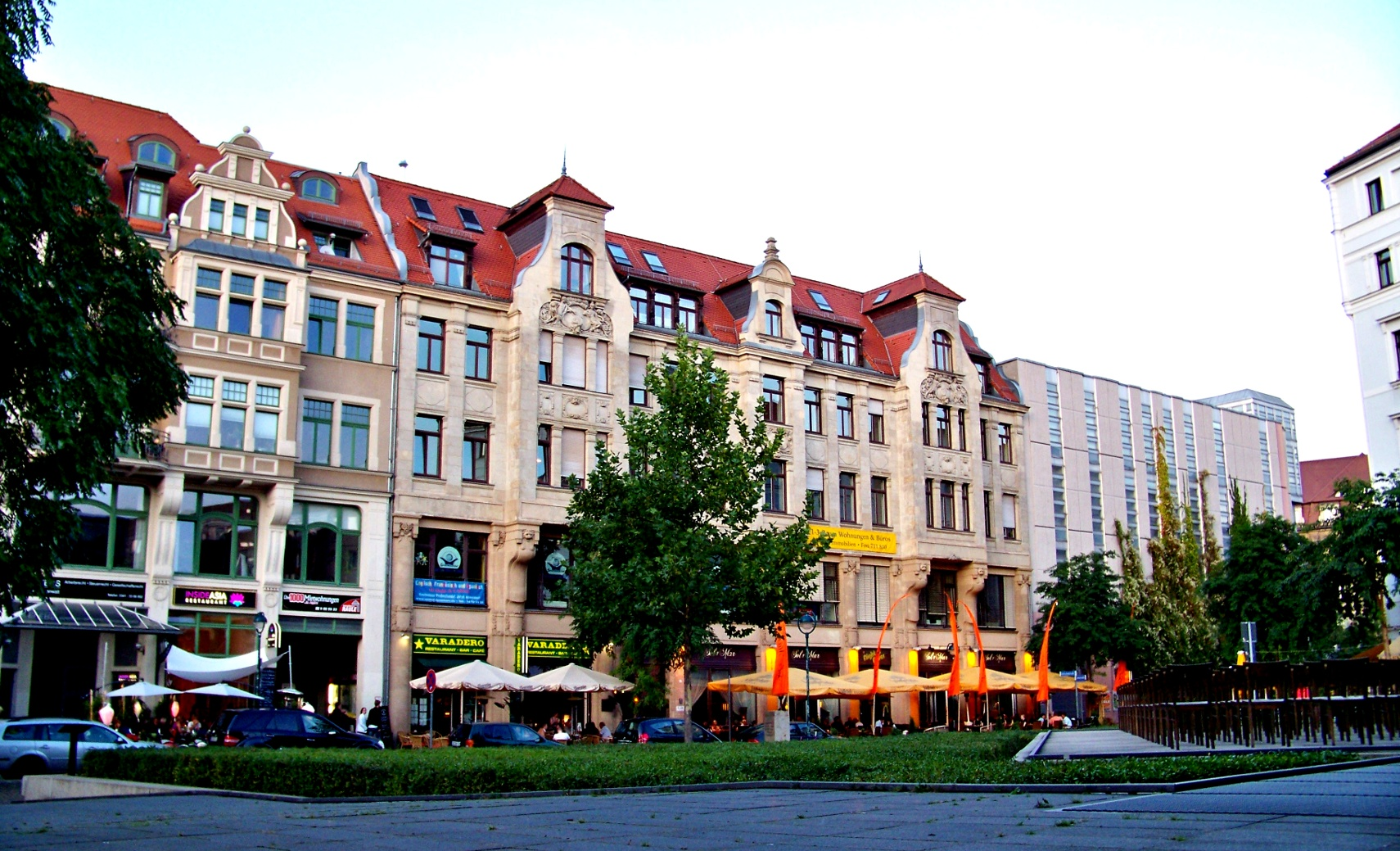
- Gottschedstrasse with the memorial to the Leipzig synagogue on the right (2009)
- Interactive map of Gottschedstrasse
- Former name: Poniatowskistrasse (part of today's Gottschedstrasse until 1933)
- Length: 650 m (2,130 ft)
- Location: Leipzig-Mitte, Leipzig, Germany
- Postal code: 04109
- West end: Elsterstrasse
- Major junctions: Thomasiusstrasse, Käthe-Kollwitz-Strasse, Bosestrasse, Zentralstrasse
- East end: Dittrichring

Construction
- Completion: 1867

Gottschedstrasse is a residential street in Leipzig, Germany, in the so-called theater district (in German language: Schauspielviertel) of the Innere Westvorstadt (inner west Vorstadt). It extends over a length of around 650 m (2,132.5 ft) in an east–west direction from the Inner City Ring Road at the level of St. Thomas Church to the Poniatowski monument at Elstermühlgraben. It is named after the writer, literary and theater theorist Johann Christoph Gottsched (1700–1766). It is primarily known as a pub and nightlife area.

== History ==
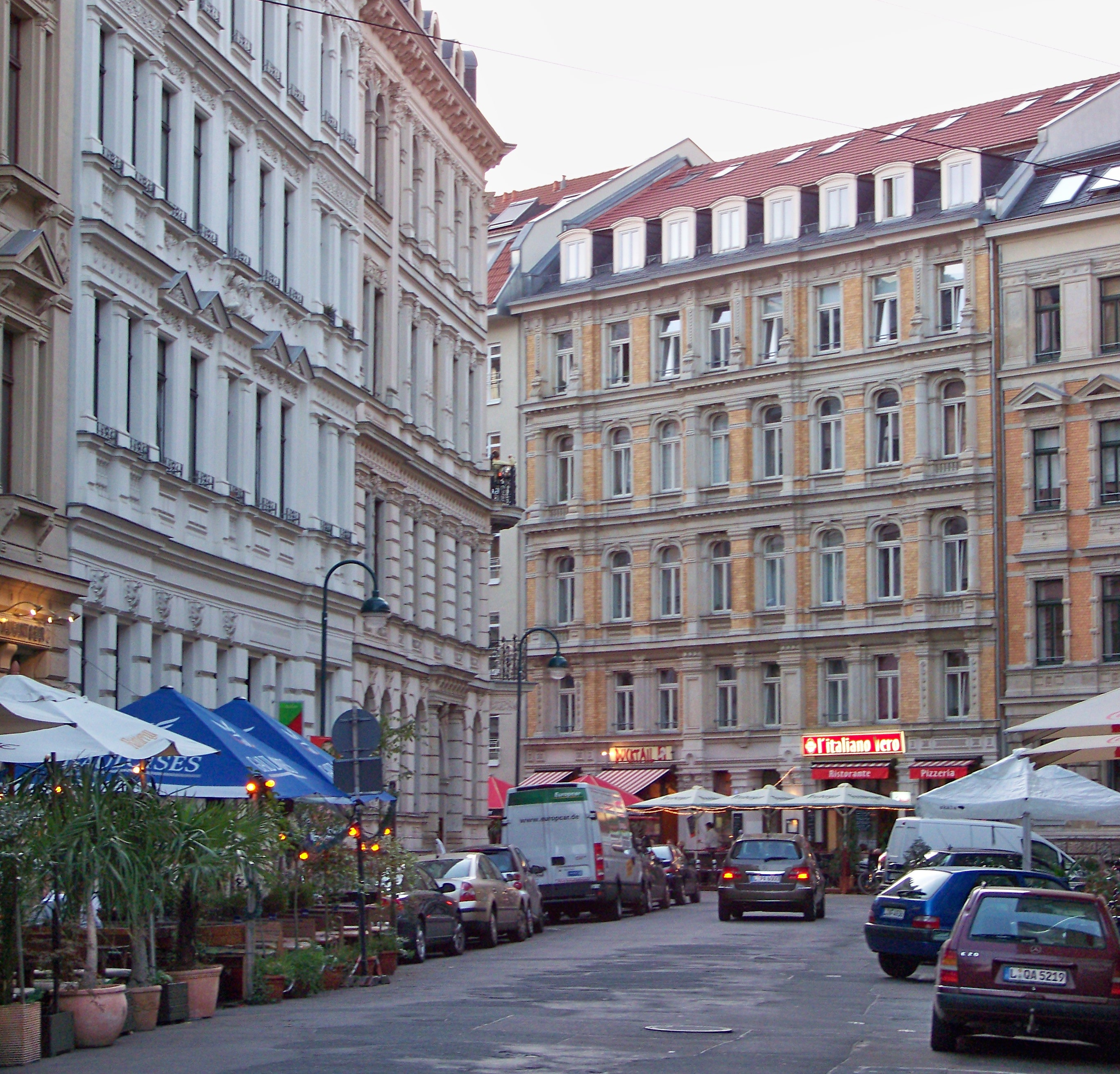
View from Käthe-Kollwitz-Straße in the west bound of Gottschedstraße (2009)

Since 1692, there was a French formal garden which was called after his last owner in the 19th century Lehmann's garden. When the city was growing rapidly, a development plan for this area was made. The extended Poniatowski Street (a planned part of the development plan for Lehmann's Garden) and the first half of Poniatowski Street, which was laid out in 1867, were renamed Gottsched Street in 1881 and 1882, respectively. This corresponds to today's section between Bosestrasse and Thomasiusstrasse. After the remaining garden area around today's Bosestrasse was redeveloped, Gottschedstrasse was extended to the inner city ring in 1898; the last section up to today's Dittrichring was part of Zentralstrasse until then. At the end of the street on today's Poniatowskiplan, formerly on the site of Gerhard's Garden, there is still the Poniatowski Monument, which commemorates the death of the Polish general Józef Antoni Poniatowski during the Battle of Leipzig in 1813.

From 1901 to 1902, the originally privately run Centraltheater was built between Gottschedstrasse and Thomasring (today Dittrichring) on Bosestrasse, which was transferred to municipal ownership in 1912 as part of the Leipzig Theater.

In 1934 the street was given its current length and route, and on 1 January 1934 the remaining part of Poniatowskistrasse was also renamed Gottschedstrasse. This sparked outrage among Polish immigrants in Leipzig and led to a protest note from the Polish government.

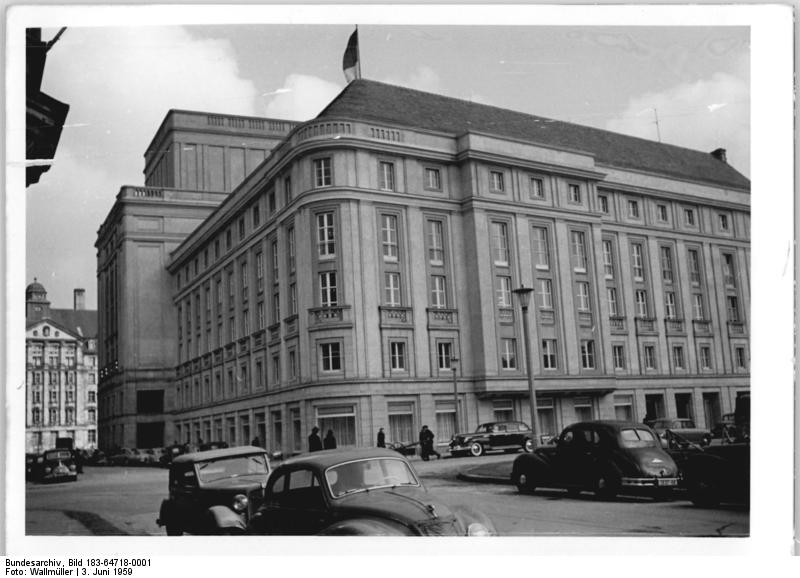
Schauspielhaus (1952)

On 4 December 1943, by the Bombing of Leipzig in World War II, all city theaters were heavily or completely destroyed. The Central Theater, which was least affected, was partially restored immediately after the end of the war and reopened as a theater on 19 December 1945. Between 1954 and 1957 the building was rebuilt in a partly neoclassical style with the main entrance on Bosestrasse and is still the main and secondary stage (e.g. the former venues Skala and Theater hinterm Eisernen) of the Schauspiel Leipzig.

For several decades since 1957, the extensive Tanzarchiv der Akademie der Künste der DDR (Dance archive of the Academy of Arts of the GDR), now the Tanzarchiv Leipzig e.V., was located at Gottschedstrasse 16, then the so-called Haus der Kammerspiele.

In the mid-1990s, the Maga Pon café with a Self-service laundry was opened in one of the numerous buildings in need of renovation at the time, and it quickly became very popular among Leipzig students and artists. In the following years, more cafés, bars and pubs were opened, and Gottschedstrasse has since established itself as one of Leipzig's pub miles. Since the 2006 FIFA World Cup, Gottschedstrasse has been one of the city of Leipzig's fan miles for international football tournaments, so also in UEFA Euro 2024. When traveling on foot from the Markt S-Bahn station to the stadium or to the indoor-arena Leipzig, Gottschedstrasse / Elsterstrasse is the shortest connection.

== Monument protection ==
To this day, some of the buildings on the street consist of representative revenue houses in closed developments, which were built from the end of the 19th century and offered space for small businesses on the lower floors . Almost all buildings are listed buildings, starting with house number 1 (Kosmoshaus), through house numbers 4 (with a memorial plaque for the painter Max Schwimmer), 6, 8 (theater), 9, 11, 12, 13, 15, 16, 17, 18, 19, 20, 21, 22, 23, 25, 28, 29, 30, 31, 32, 33, 34, 35, 36, 37, 38, 39, 40, 41, 44 to 45.

== The Leipzig Synagogue and the commemoration of its destruction ==
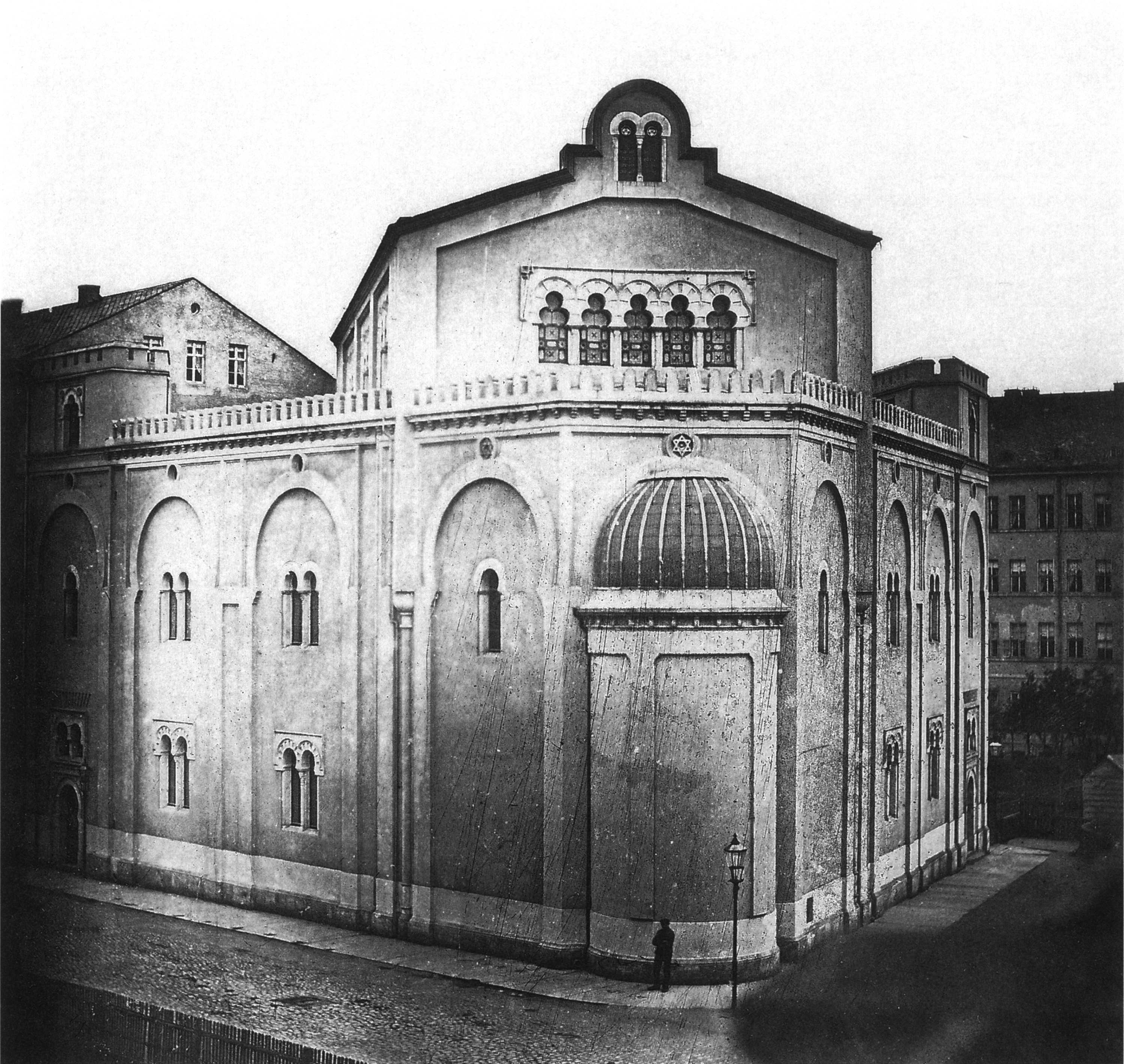
Leipzig Synagogue, photo taken by Bertha Wehnert-Beckmann, around 1860

From 1855 to 1938, the Leipzig Synagogue - the oldest and most important synagogue in Leipzig - was located at Gottschedstrasse 3, at the corner of Zentralstrasse, and was styled in Moorish Revival architecture. During the November pogroms, the building was set on fire on the night of November 9 to 10, 1938 and largely destroyed. The Israelite religious community then ensured the demolition of the ruins, which lasted until February 1939. Immediately after the destruction, Hubert Ritter, the local city planning officer until 1930, submitted a project sketch for the new development of the site on behalf of the Leipzig Insurance Company on 23 December 1938, but it received no attention. The area then lay fallow for a long time and was largely used as a parking lot until 2000. Since 1966, a memorial stone on the site of the former north facade commemorates the synagogue. In 2001, the former location of the synagogue was converted into a memorial in memory of the November pogroms of 1938. The memorial was designed by the Leipzig architects Sebastian Helm and Anna Dilengite. It traces the floor plan of the synagogue and offers a memorial place with 140 bronze chairs.

Commemoration

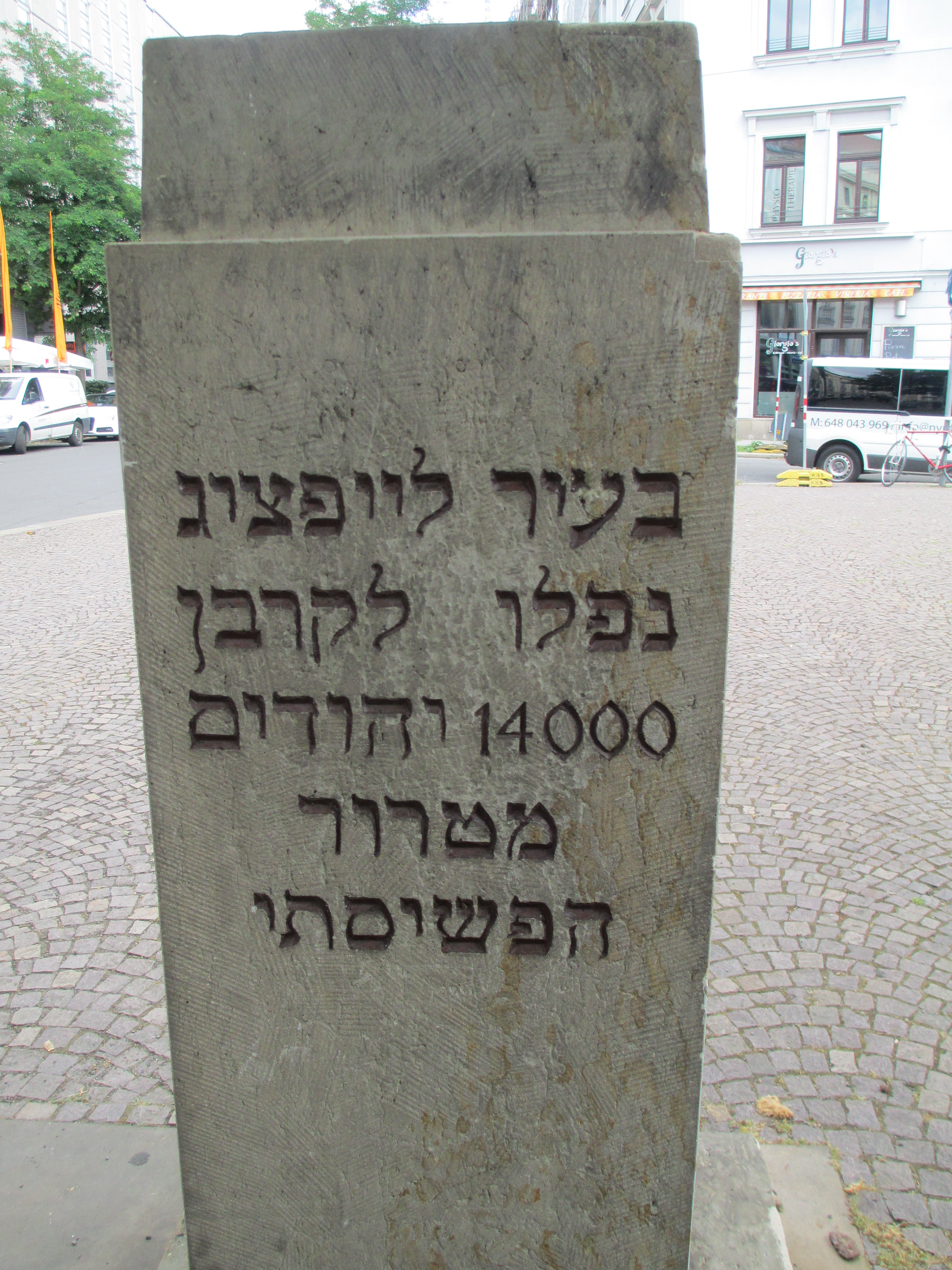
Memorial stone to 14,000 murdered Jewish citizens

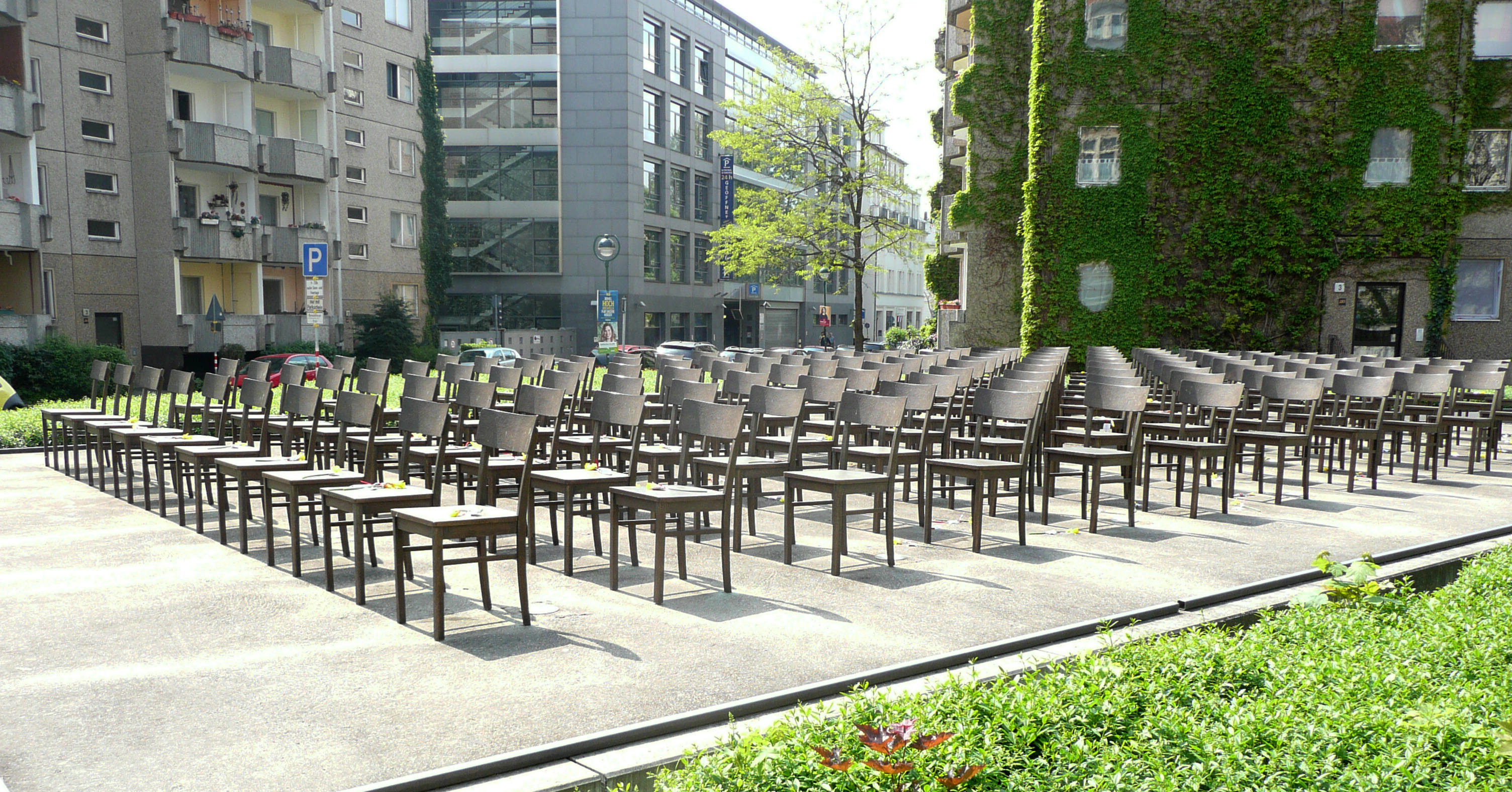
140 bronze chairs

== Notable former residents ==
The first Leipzig apartment of the Austrian composer, conductor and Kapellmeister Gustav Mahler (1860–1911), who worked in the city from 1886 to 1888, was on the second floor of what is now Gottschedstrasse 25 (then 4) from 1886 to the end of January 1887. Walter Ulbricht, who later became a politician and chairman of the Central Committee of the Socialist Unity Party of Germany and the State Council of the GDR, was born in the attic apartment in the same house in 1893 and spent the first seven years of his life there. On 30 June 1969, on the occasion of his 76th birthday, a memorial plaque was unveiled at the house, which was removed by an unknown hand in the summer of 1994. The later politician and Reichskanzler Gustav Stresemann also moved into Gottschedstrasse 25 around 1899 as a student at the University of Leipzig.

The cantor, composer and religious teacher Albert Weill lived on the second floor of today's Gottschedstrasse 40 (then Poniatowskistrasse 12) from 1920 to 1930. From June to December 1920, his son, the composer Kurt Weill (1900–1950), also lived there. Joachim Ringelnatz (1883–1934) and his family also lived in this house from 1894 to 1900.

== See also ==
- List of streets and squares in Leipzig

== Bibliography ==
- Klank, Gina; Griebsch, Gernoth (1995). Stadtarchiv Leipzig (ed.). Lexikon Leipziger Straßennamen [Leipzig street names] (in German). Leipzig: Verlag im Wissenschaftszentrum Leipzig. p. 87. ISBN 3-930433-09-5.
- Innere Westvorstadt. Eine historische und städtebauliche Studie (in German). Leipzig: PRO Leipzig e.V. on behalf of the City of Leipzig, Urban Planning Office (Stadtplanungsamt). 1998.

== Footnotes ==
(Incorporates information translated from the German Wikipedia)
