= Werner Buschnakowski =

German cantor and organist

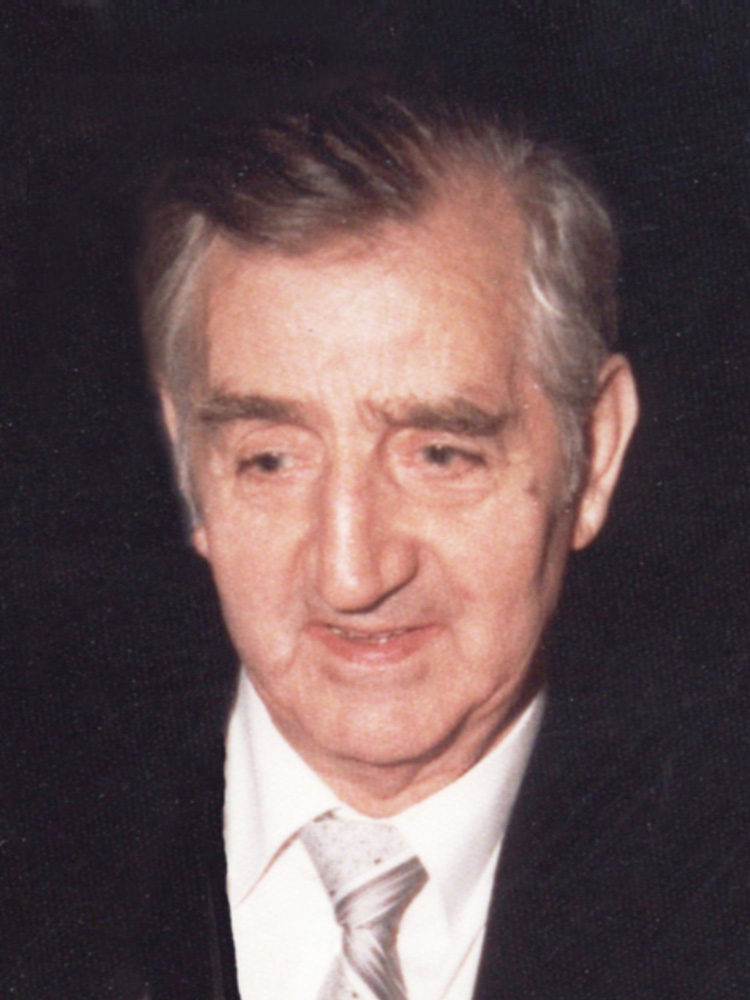
Werner Buschnakowski (1987)

Werner Buschnakowski (21 January 1910 – 13 November 1995) was a German cantor, organist, harpsichordist and music educator.

== Life and career ==
Born in Rehsau in East Prussia, Buschnakowski was the son of the teacher Walter Buschnakowski. He attended the Realgymnasium in Insterburg and the Deutsch-Orden-Oberrealschule in Wehlau, obtaining the Abitur.

Already as a pupil he played the organ and was called upon by the organists of Insterburg for substitute services at the age of eleven. At the age of fourteen he became a permanent substitute for the organist of the Lutherkirche in Insterburg. During his last two years at school, he was an independent organist at the church of Karalene near Insterburg.

In 1931, he went to Leipzig to work at the Kirchenmusikalisches Institut to study church music. One of his teachers here was Friedrich Högner. Because of his good performance, he was admitted to the final examination after only three years instead of the regular four, which he passed with "good" in the summer of 1934. In April 1934, he had already taken up the post of organist at the Church of Reconciliation in Gohlis. In 1937, he also became cantor.

In the church, built in 1932, he had an organ from the Emil Hammer Orgelbau workshop at his disposal. Buschnakowski used the organ and the church to perform classical organ music and church instrumental and vocal chamber music outside of church services. Thus there was a Buxtehude cycle with twelve concerts on the occasion of his 300th birthday and a Bach series with all the composer's organ works. Between 1934 and 1938, the Reichs-Rundfunk-Gesellschaft broadcast 14 organ concerts from the Church of Reconciliation.

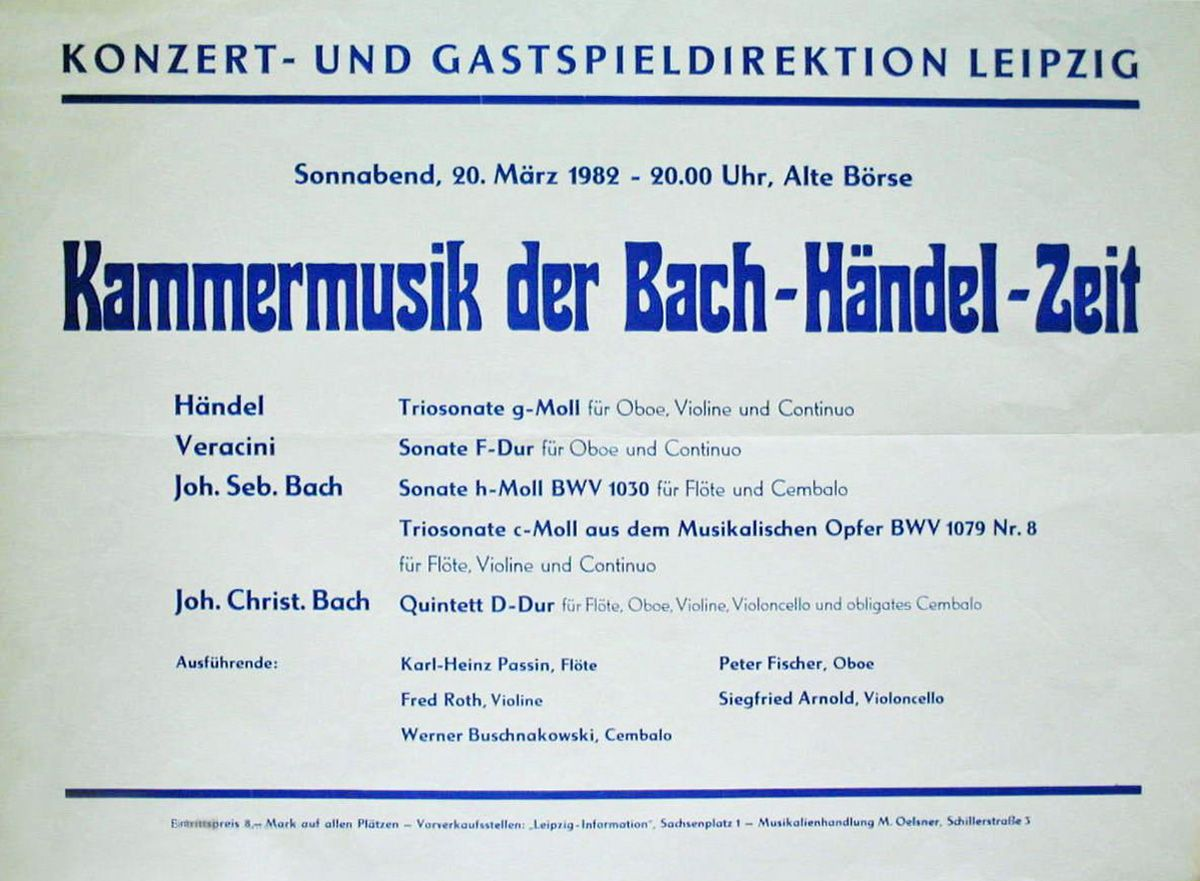
Chamber music poster

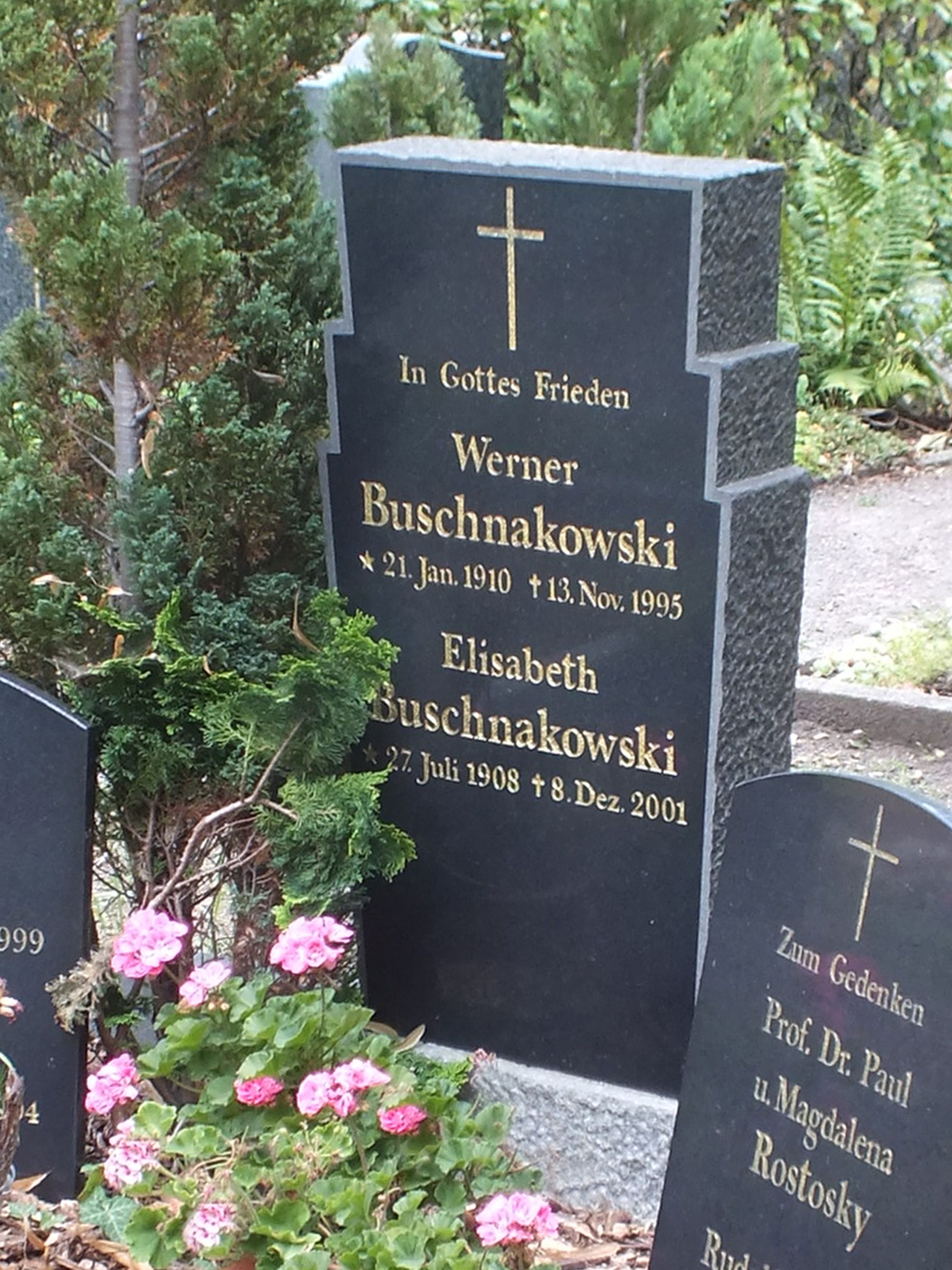
His grave at the Friedhof Connewitz

After military service from 1940 and Soviet captivity until 1949, during which he suffered paralysis of the right middle finger, he resumed his organist activities in 1950. Due to the parish's refusal to adapt the organ of the Versöhnungskirche to the demands of the time, he now devoted himself increasingly to the harpsichord, which led, among other things, to collaboration with the Thomanerchor at motet's and to participation in their travels.

In 1957, together with leading members of the Gewandhausorchester, he founded the long-standing Leipzig concert series "Baroque Chamber Music", later called "Chamber Music of the Bach-Händel Period"", with up to eight concerts a year. He played the harpsichord at the concerts in the Gohliser Schlösschen and later at the Alte Handelsbörse until 1984.

Buschnakowski began his teaching career in 1952 as a lecturer at the Hochschule für Kirchenmusik Dresden, from 1959 to 1961 he taught at the conservatory in Halle and from 1961 to 1971 at the musicological institute of the University of Leipzig.

He ended his service in the congregation of the Reconciliation Church in 1985. After a stroke, disabled and cared for in his home in Marienbrunn, he died on 13 November 1995 in a hospital in Grimma aged 85.

== Family ==
In 1936, Buschnakowski married Elisabeth Restosky, whom he had met while studying music. The couple had two sons and a daughter. From, 1939 the family lived in a house in Marienbrunn. Their son Andreas (1936–2005) was organist and cantor in Chemnitz.
