= Krochsiedlung =

Coordinates: 51°22′40″N 12°21′45″E

The Krochsiedlung (also called Neu-Gohlis) is a 16 ha (40 acres) residential development in the Neues Bauen architectural style in Gohlis, a district of Leipzig, Germany. It was built between 1929 and 1930 and was intended to be the first construction phase of a planned residential town. The residential buildings form a heritage-protected complex in Gohlis-Nord. The Krochsiedlung is one of the most important examples of the classical modern style in Leipzig.

== History and architecture ==
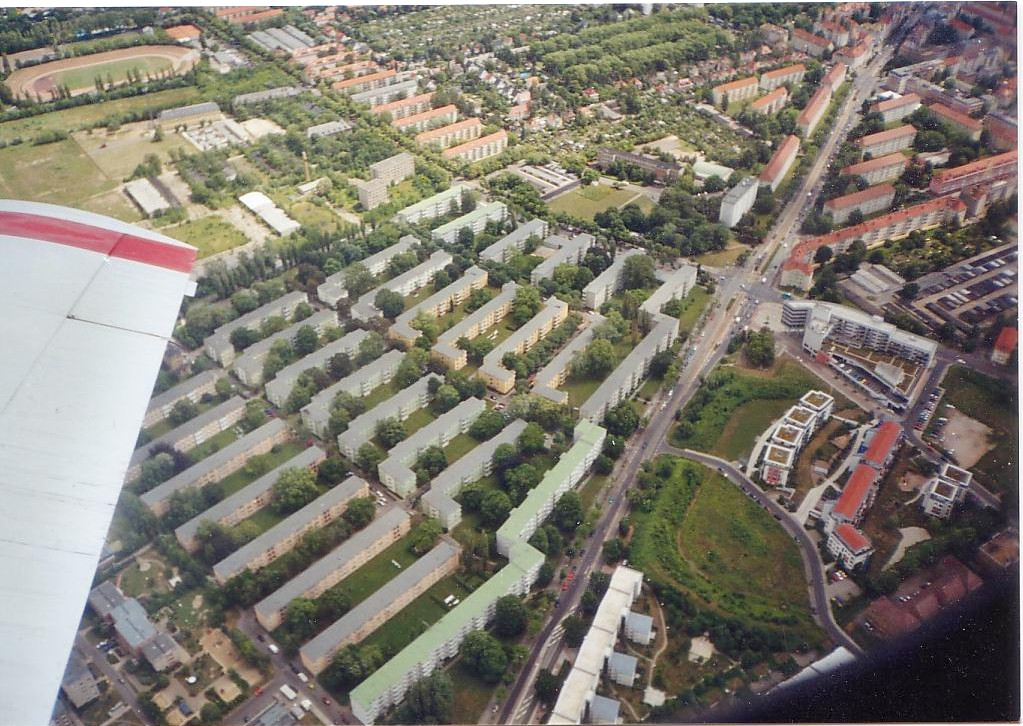
Aerial view of the Krochsiedlung (2004)

The Aktiengesellschaft für Haus- und Grundbesitz, whose main shareholder was the Bankhaus Kroch jun. KG a. A. owned by the Jewish banker Hans Kroch, announced a competition in 1928 for the construction of a 75-hectare "New Gohlis residential town". Kroch, who commissioned the Kroch high-rise building on Leipzig's Augustusplatz in the same year, also had a significant influence on the design. The contract was awarded to the Berlin architects Paul Mebes and Paul Emmerich, who had proposed building in rows of houses. To carry out the first construction phase, Mebes and Emmerlich formed a planning partnership with the Leipzig architects Max Fricke and Johannes Koppe and the Dresden Adolf Muesmann.

Construction began in the summer of 1929. The first construction phase with 1,018 apartments was completed in the autumn of 1930, and was to remain the only one. The planned further phases, which aimed to create a residential town four times as large with 4,500 apartments for around 15,000 residents, would have been the largest housing estate built in the Weimar Republic. This however was never implemented as a result of the Great Depression, which also affected the Kroch bank, followed by Adolf Hitler's rise to power.

At the time of its construction, the estate epitomized a high standard of living even by comparison to 21st-century Germany. It consists of 3- and 4-storey apartment buildings, totalling 1,018 apartments, with one to four rooms. Loggias, arbours and large windows ensure good lighting. There are some smaller commercial units on the ground floor. The rows of houses are separated by generous green spaces. Central heating through district heating from a separate heating plant, hot water connection and a bathroom in each apartment offered a high level of comfort quite rare at the time of construction. The development also included low-rise buildings with shops for local supplies on Max-Liebermann-Straße, which was therefore called "Ladenstraße".

Near the Krochsiedlung, the Versöhnungskirche ("Church of Reconciliation") was built between 1930 and 1932 as an outstanding example of modern German church architecture based on a design by the Leipzig architect Hans Heinrich Grotjahn. It was to be the center of the planned residential town of Gohlis.

After 1990, the complex was extensively renovated. The Bürgerverein Krochsiedlung e. V. ("Krochsiedlung Citizens' Association") was founded in 1991 to preserve the architectural and historical heritage of the Krochsiedlung.

== Gallery ==
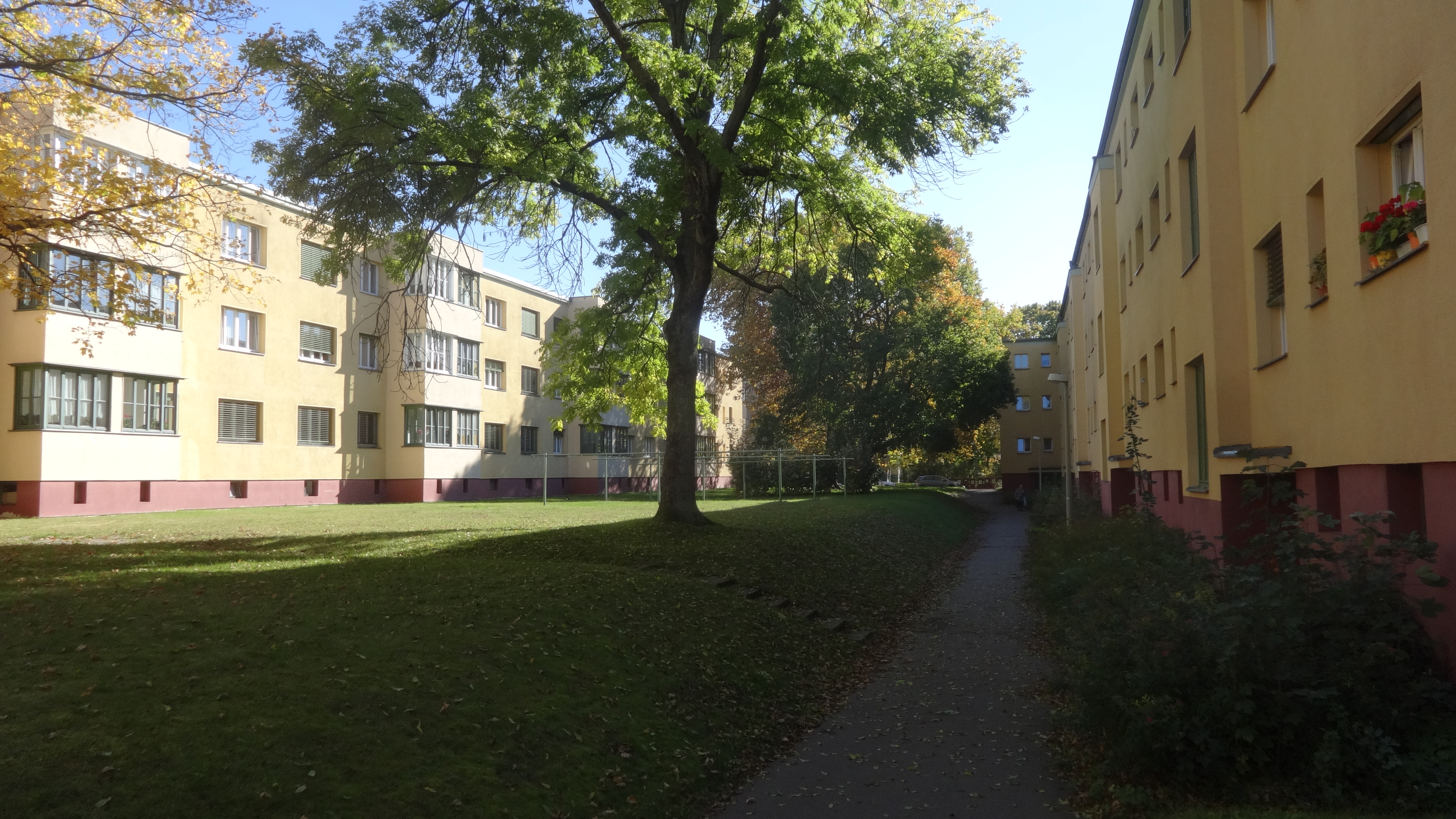

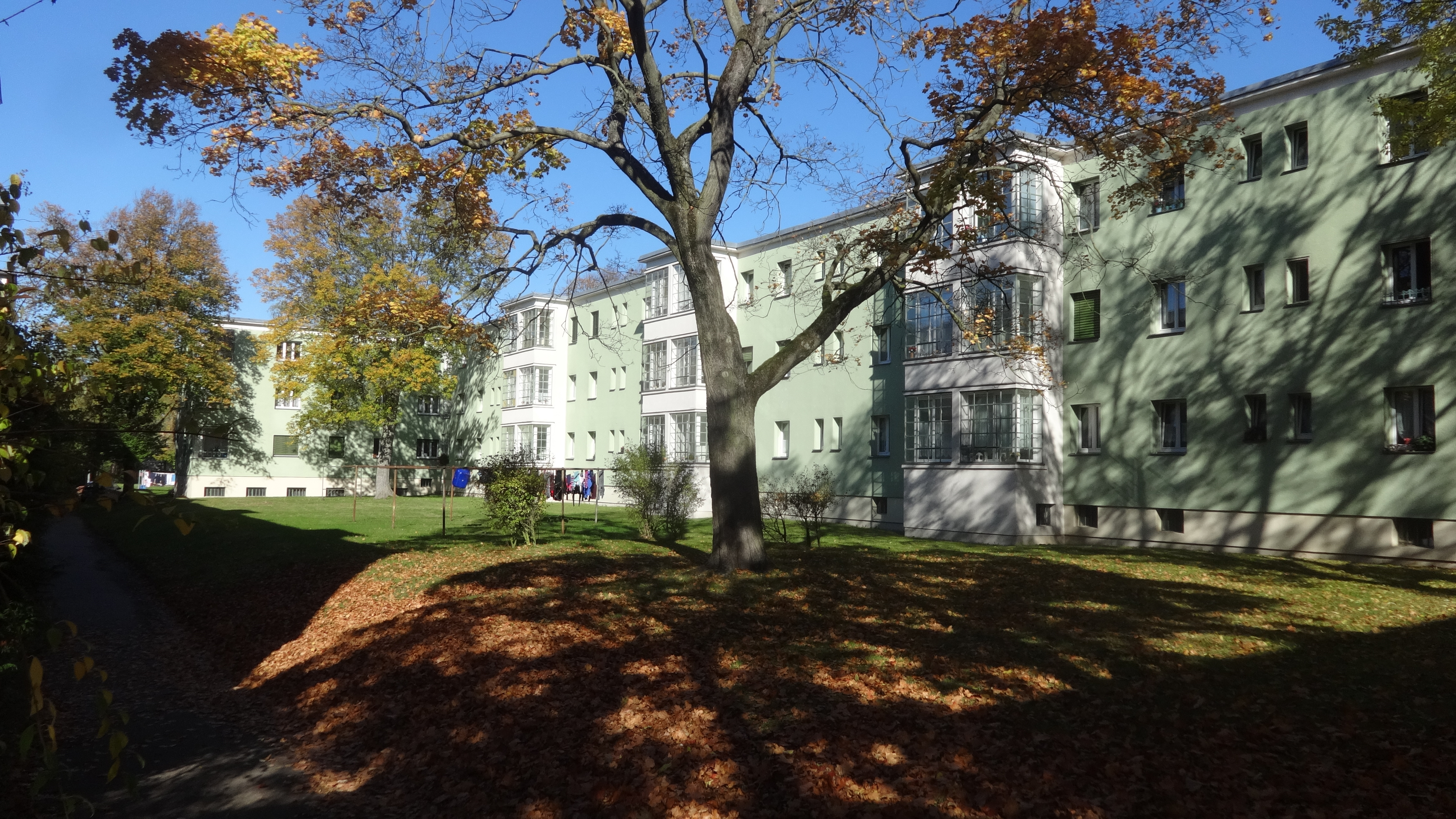

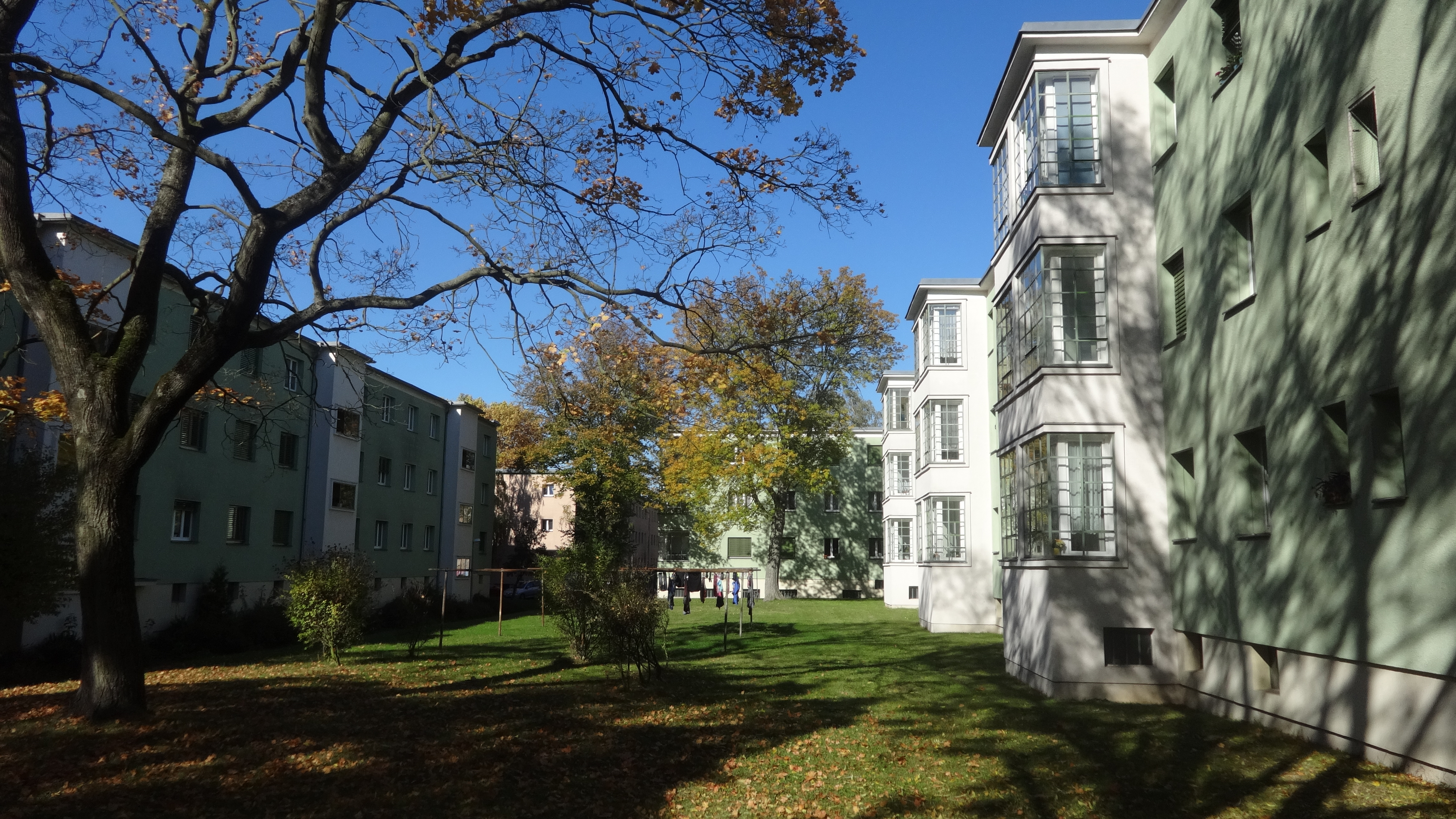

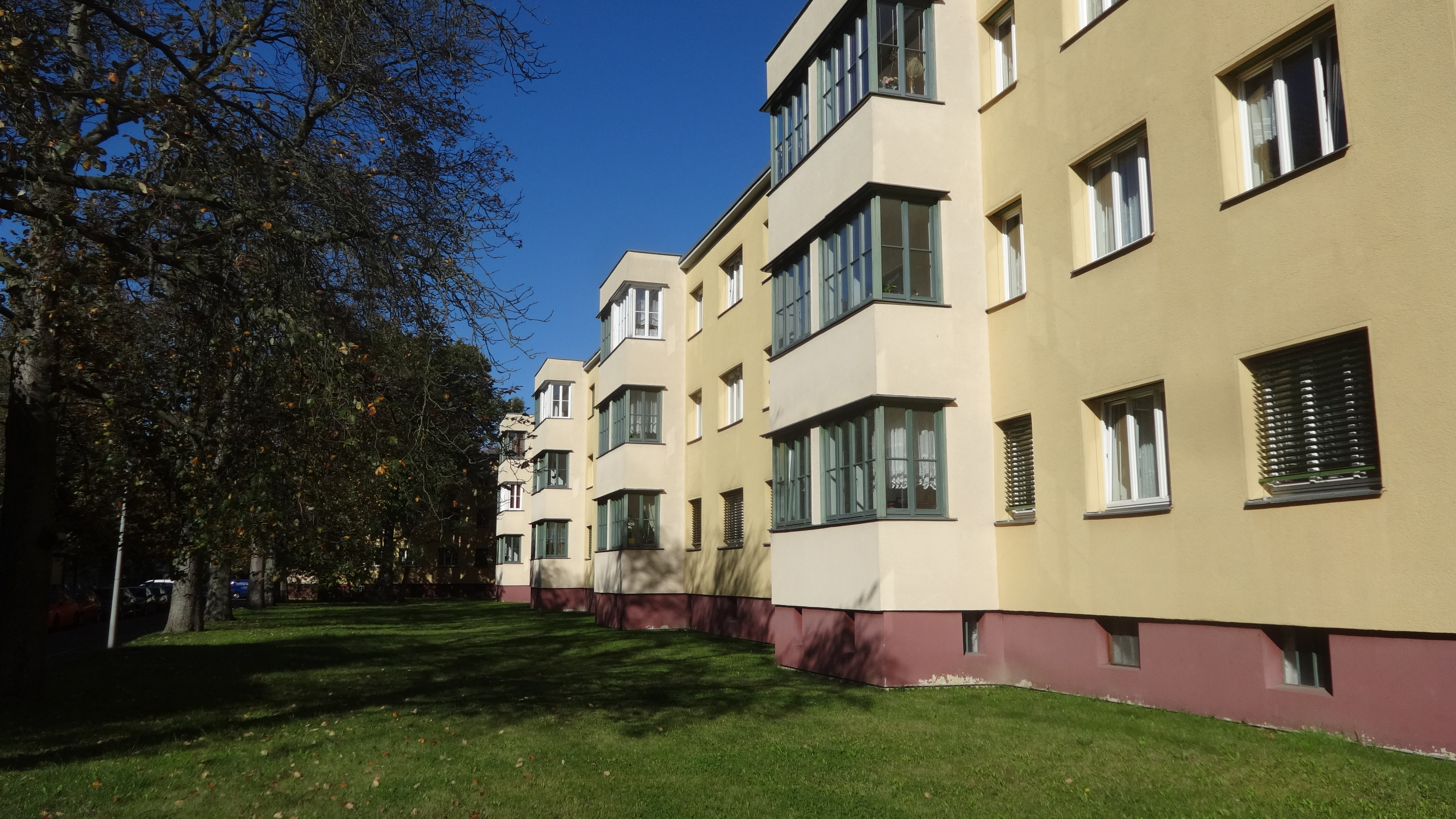

== Literature ==
- Wolfgang Hocquél: Leipzig. Baumeister und Bauten. Von der Romanik bis zur Gegenwart. Tourist Verlag, Berlin 1990, ISBN 3-350-00333-8.
- Aylin Genca: Die Wohnstadt Neu-Gohlis in Leipzig der Architekten Mebes und Emmerich. In: Christiane Wolf (Hrsg.): Das „Land in der Mitte“. Architektur-, Denkmals- und Wohnungsbauprojekte der Moderne. Bauhaus-Universität, Weimar 2004, S. 147–168.
- Nora Pester: Krochsiedlung Neu Gohlis. In: Dies.: Jüdisches Leipzig. Menschen – Orte – Geschichte. Hentrich & Hentrich, Berlin u. a. 2023, ISBN 978-3-95565-562-4, p. 139.

== Links ==
- Krochsiedlung at archINFORM (mit Literaturnachweisen)
- Marcus Schoft (2014-12-15). ""Der Norden ist halt nicht in"". Einundleipzig.de.
- Ralf Julke: Die 150-jährige Geschichte der Familie Kroch und ihrer legendären Unternehmen in Leipzig, Leipziger Internet Zeitung
