= Hans-Otto Spithaler =

German banker

Hans-Otto Spithaler (born 1937 in Westphalia) is a German banker, lawyer and author who worked on restitution issues.

== Life and work ==
In 1973, he moved from the banking business to the paper processing industry in Berlin. He became a board member of Kroch companies, including "AG für Haus- und Grundbesitz.

For ten years worked on the restitution of looted art of the property aryanized from the Kroch family during the Nazi era. He is involved in various Kroch companies as a member of the supervisory board.

Hans-Otto Spithaler and the journalist Monika Zimmermann, wrote a history of the Jewish family business Kroch in Leipzig with its headquarter in the Kroch High-rise and its destruction under National Socialism. The Kroch restitution case was one of the largest private restitution cases.

== Literature ==
- Hans-Otto Spithaler, Rolf H. Weber, Monika Zimmermann: Kroch – Der Name bleibt: Das Schicksal eines jüdischen Familienunternehmens in Leipzig, mitteldeutscher Verlag, Halle 2018, ISBN 978-3-96311-007-8
