= Hans Kroch =

Banker, entrepreneur, and property developer

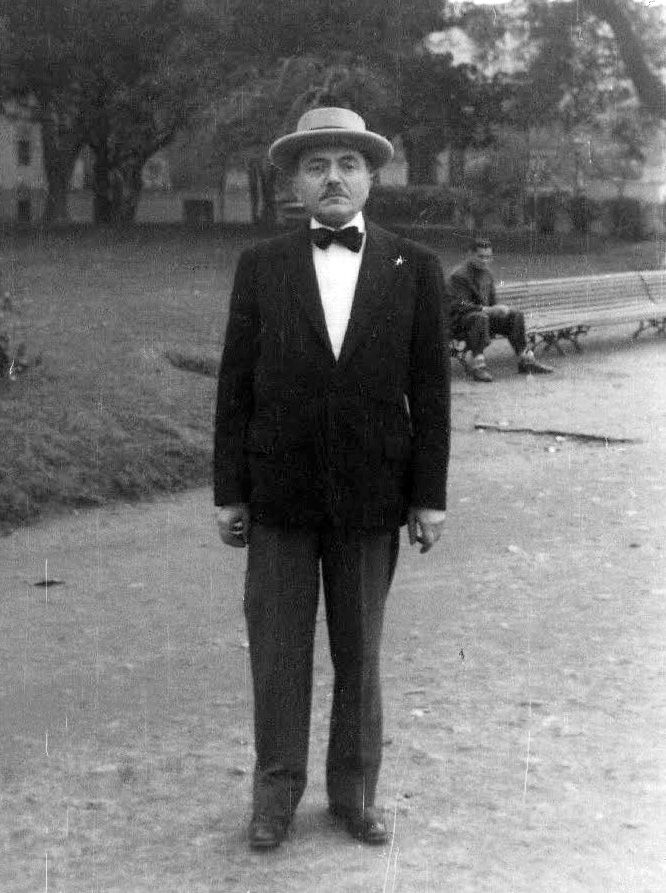
Hans Kroch in the 1920s

Hans Meyer Zwi Kroch (Hebrew: הנס קרוך; 14 March 1879 – 18 April 1955) was a German-Jewish, and later Israeli, banker, entrepreneur, and property developer.

== Life and career ==
Kroch attended the König-Albert-Gymnasium in Leipzig. In 1922, he joined the private bank Kroch jr. KG a. A., which had been founded by his father Martin Samuel Kroch (1853–1926) in 1877, and later became a personally liable partner. In 1923 he was a founding and supervisory board member of the Leipzig Trade Fair and Exhibition AG.

In 1928, the Kroch bank moved into the Kroch High-rise in Augustusplatz, designed by the architect German Bestelmeyer. At 43 meters, it was the first high-rise building in Leipzig. As the main shareholder in the AG für Haus- und Grundimmobilien, Kroch additionally financed the construction of the Krochsiedlung in Leipzig-Gohlis in 1929–1930, a residential complex in the classical modern style, which was unofficially named after him.

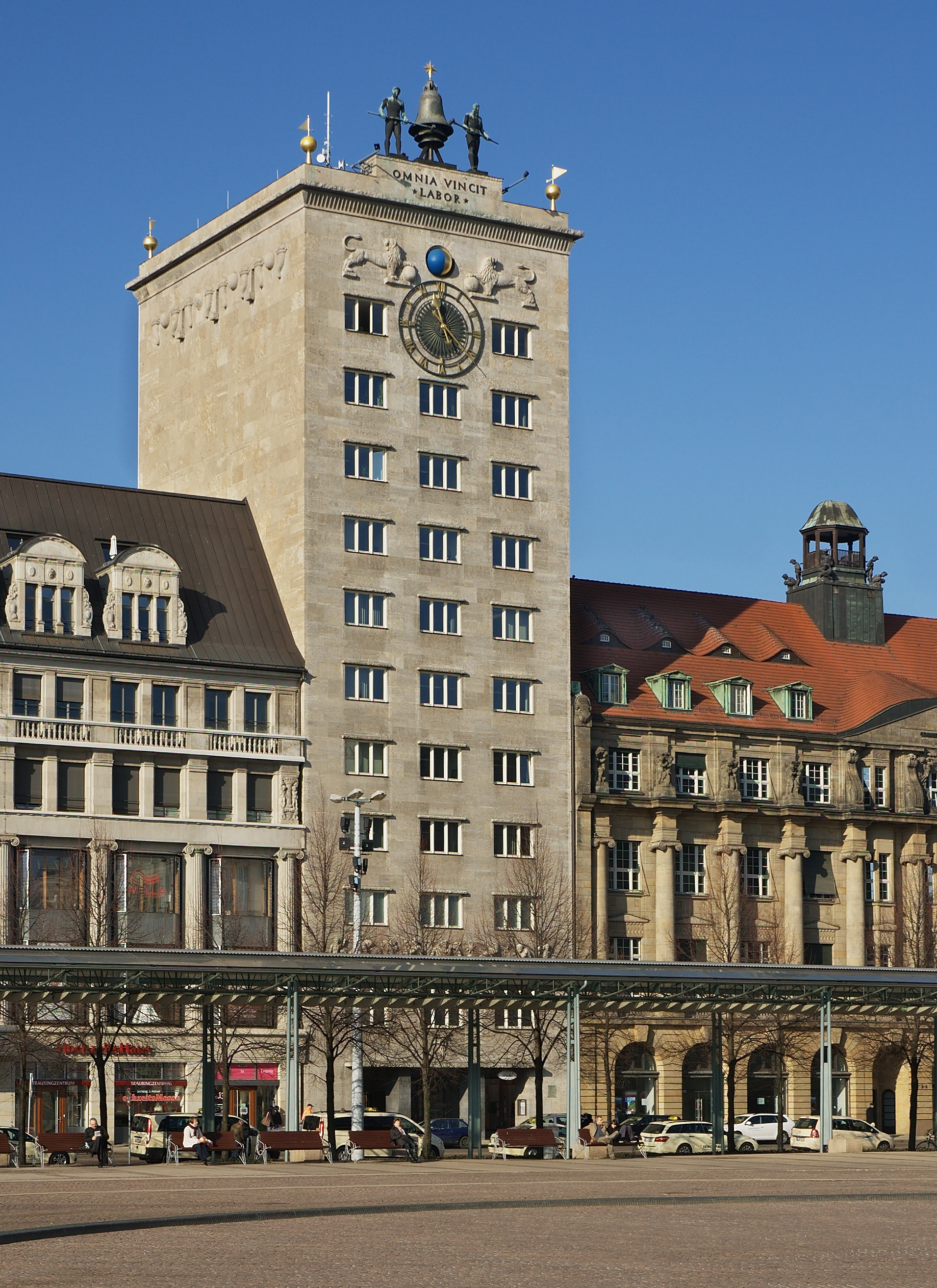
Kroch High-rise in Augustusplatz, Leipzig

In the course of the "Aryanization" of German companies by the Nazis, Kroch was arrested on 10 November 1938 in the wake of Kristallnacht and transported first to Buchenwald and later Sachsenhausen. Only after he had submitted a waiver of the Kroch bank's assets on behalf of all family members was he released and the bank taken over by Industrie- und Handelsbank AG. Kroch managed to escape to Amsterdam with his children, later emigrating to Argentina and finally to Israel, where he built the hotel complex Eretz Hatzvi ("Deerland", later renamed "Holyland") in the Jerusalem suburb of Bayit veGan. His wife Ella Kroch, née Baruch (1896–1942), who initially stayed behind to cover up the escape, was arrested during her own escape. She was deported to the Ravensbrück concentration camp in 1940 and murdered there two years later on 12 May 1942.

His son Jacob died in the 1948 Palestine war in 1948 during the battle for Kibbutz Nitzanim. In memory of him, Hans Kroch commissioned a detailed model of Jerusalem including the Second Temple as it would have appeared before its destruction in 70 CE and donated it to the city of Jerusalem. It has been located on the campus of the Israel Museum in Jerusalem since 2006.

== See also ==
- History of the Jews in Leipzig
