= Rudolf Opitz =

German artist (1908–1939)

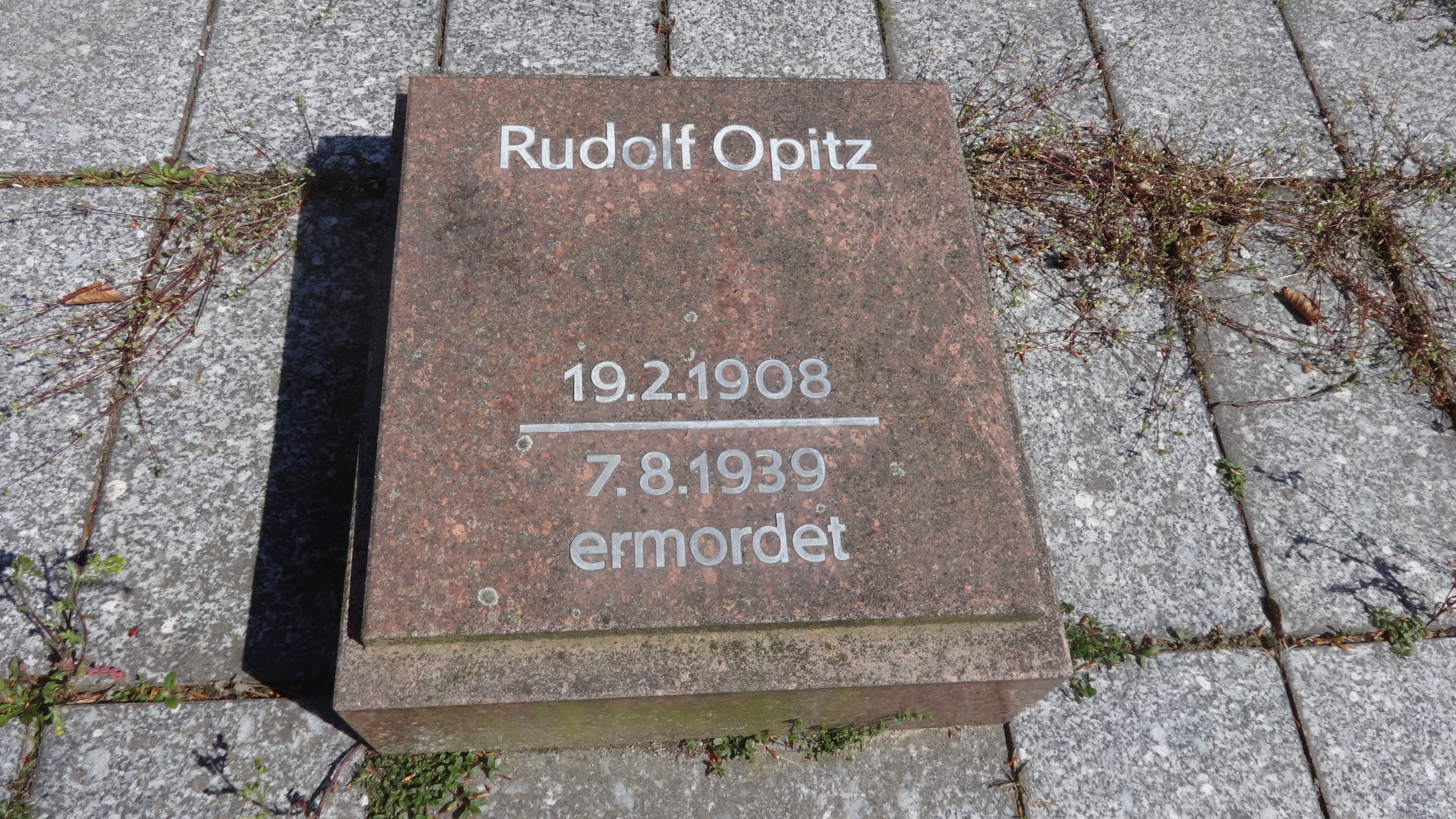
Rudolf (Rudi) Opitz's gravestone at Südfriedhof in Leipzig

Rudolf "Rudi" Opitz (1908–1939) was a German lithographer, Nazi Party opponent.

His name appears on the Rudi-Opitz-Straße, a service road (Anliegerstraße) in Leipzig-Gohlis. The Gohlis tram depot (Straßenbahnhof) was named Jugendbahnhof „Rudi Opitz“ from 1950 to 1994.

From 1992 to 2004, Mittelschule „Rudi Opitz“ was the official, but seldom-used, name of the 94th School (Secondary school), Schulgebäude Miltitzer Weg 3, Leipzig-Grünau. To 1992, Rudi-Opitz-Oberschule has been the official name of the previous polytechnic high school at the same location.
