= Johann Gottlob Böhme =

German historian

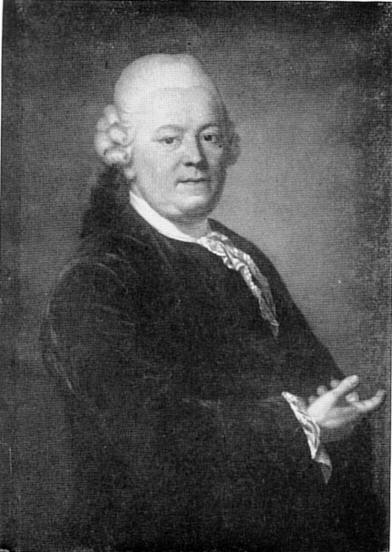
Johann Gottlob Böhme

Johann Gottlob Böhme (20 March 1717 in Wurzen – 20 June 1780 in Leipzig) was a German historian.

Beginning in 1736 he studied history at the University of Leipzig. In 1747 he acquired his magister degree at Leipzig, where four years later he became an associate professor at the faculty of philosophy. In 1758 he succeeded Christian Gottlieb Jöcher as professor of history at the university.

On four separate occasions he served as rector at the University of Leipzig. In 1766 he was appointed councilor and court historiographer for the Electorate of Saxony. He was client of the Gohlis Palace. In 1875, the thoroughfare Böhmestraße in Gohlis (today part of Leipzig) was named in his honor.

== Published works ==
In 1763–65 he published a highly regarded work on the Peace of Oliva (1660), titled Acta pacis Oliviensis inedita (2 volumes). Other noted written efforts by Böhme include:

- De commerciorum apud Germanos initiis, Leipzig (1751).
- De ortu regiae dignitatis in Polonia recitatio academica, (1754).
- De Henrico VIII. Anglorum rege Imperium Romanum post obitum Maximiliani I. adfectante, Leipzig (1758).
- Epitome rerum Germanicarum ab anno Chr. 1617 ad an. 1643, (1760).
- De nationis Germanicae in curia Romana protectione dissertatio, (1763).
- De ordine Draconis instituto a Sigismundo Imp. prolusio, Leipzig (1764).
- Carmina latina, vel repetite vel primum edita, Leipzig (1780).
