= Rydzówka, Węgorzewo County =

Rydzówka
- Village
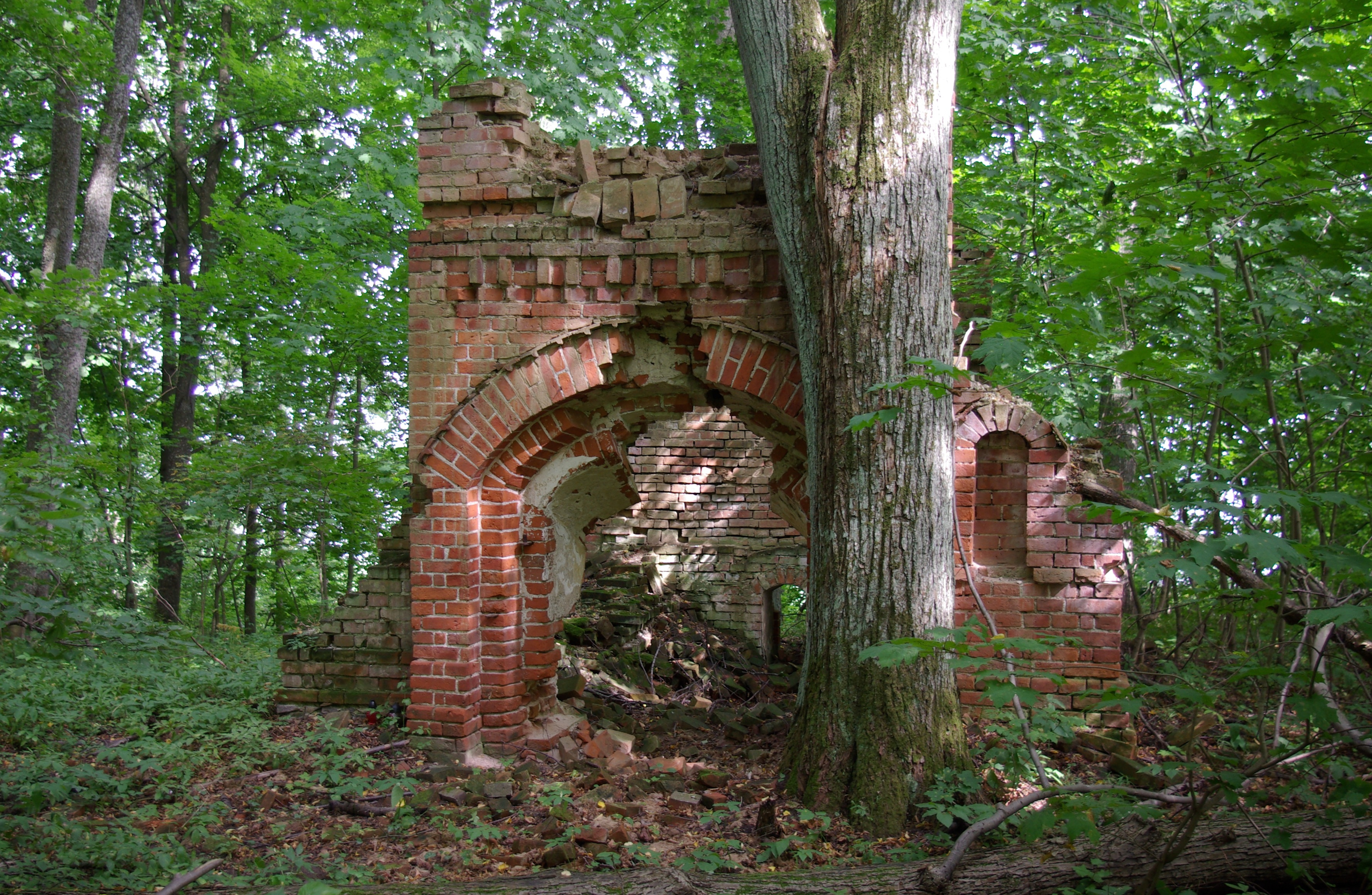
- Cemetery in Rydzówka

- Location within Poland
- Coordinates: 54°14′24″N 21°34′10″E
- Country: Poland
- Voivodeship: Warmian-Masurian
- County: Węgorzewo
- Gmina: Węgorzewo
- Founded: 1403
- Time zone: UTC+1 (CET)
  - Summer (DST): UTC+2 (CEST)
- Vehicle registration: NWE

Rydzówka [rɨˈd͡zufka] is a village in the administrative district of Gmina Węgorzewo, within Węgorzewo County, Warmian-Masurian Voivodeship, in northern Poland, close to the border with the Kaliningrad Oblast of Russia.

The village was founded in 1403.

Composer Werner Buschnakowski was born in the village in 1910.
