= Church of Reconciliation, Leipzig =

Church of Reconciliation Versöhnungskirche
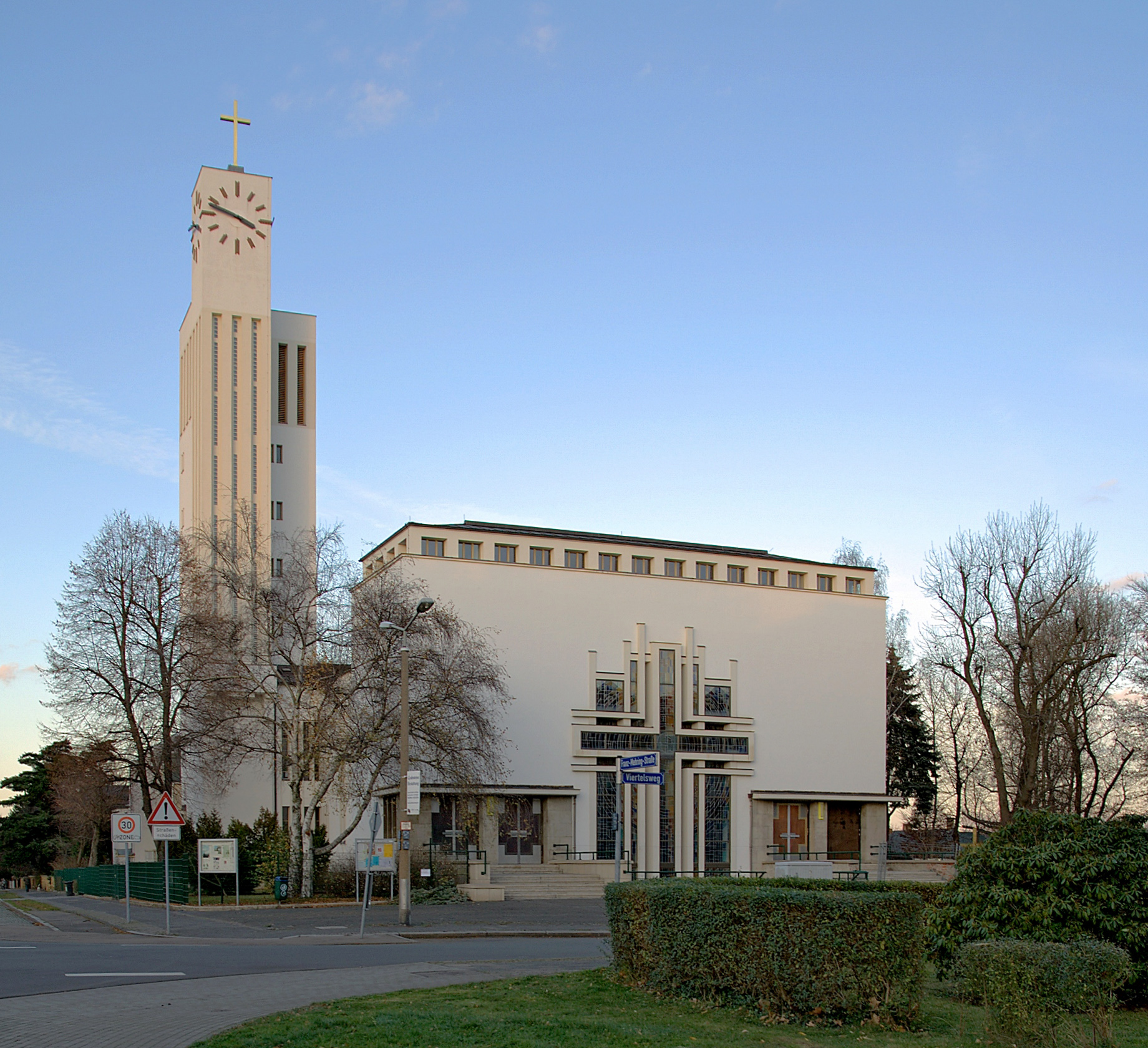
- Church of Reconciliation; Versöhnungskirche
- 51.3719°N 12.3686°E
- Location: Leipzig
- Country: Germany
- Denomination: Lutheran
- Website: versoehnungs-gemeinde.de

History
- Status: Parish church

Architecture
- Functional status: Active
- Style: Rationalism
- Years built: 1930-1932; 1993, 2008 (renovations)

Administration
- Division: Evangelical-Lutheran Church of Saxony

The Church of Reconciliation (German: Versöhnungskirche) is a Lutheran church in the German city of Leipzig, in the locality of Gohlis.

It constitutes an important example of modern ecclesiastical architecture. It is under heritage protection.

== History ==
The church was built from 1930 to 1932 according to a design by Hans Heinrich Grotjahn in the architectural style called "New Objectivity". It was to be the center of the planned residential town of Gohlis with the Krochsiedlung as its first construction phase.

== Features ==
It is a building with a reinforced concrete structural system, with a single nave without interior piers. Above is the triforium that houses the organ.

On the west side stands the 39 metres (128 ft) tall bell tower. Due to the site conditions, the usual orientation of the choir to the east was abandoned when the church was built. The church is therefore oriented south–north.

The façade is completely white. The objective and functional form, the striking tower with vertical window strips and the cross-shaped window in the entrance area led from 1933 to attacks by National Socialist leaders on the church council because of allegedly degenerate art. This criticism also referred to the liturgical furnishings by the artists Max Alfred Brumme, Odo Tattenpach and Curt Metze.

== See also ==
- Werner Buschnakowski, cantor and organist

== Bibliography ==
- Menting, Annette (2022). Leipzig. Architektur und Kunst (in German) (2nd ed.). Ditzingen: Reclam-Verlag. ISBN 978-315-014310-0.
- Wolfgang Hocquél (2023). Architekturführer Leipzig. Von der Romanik bis zur Gegenwart (in German). Leipzig: Passage Verlag. pp. 182–183. ISBN 978-3-95415-128-8.
