= Budde-Haus =

19th-century building in Leipzig, Germany

Coordinates: 51.3638°N 12.3738°E

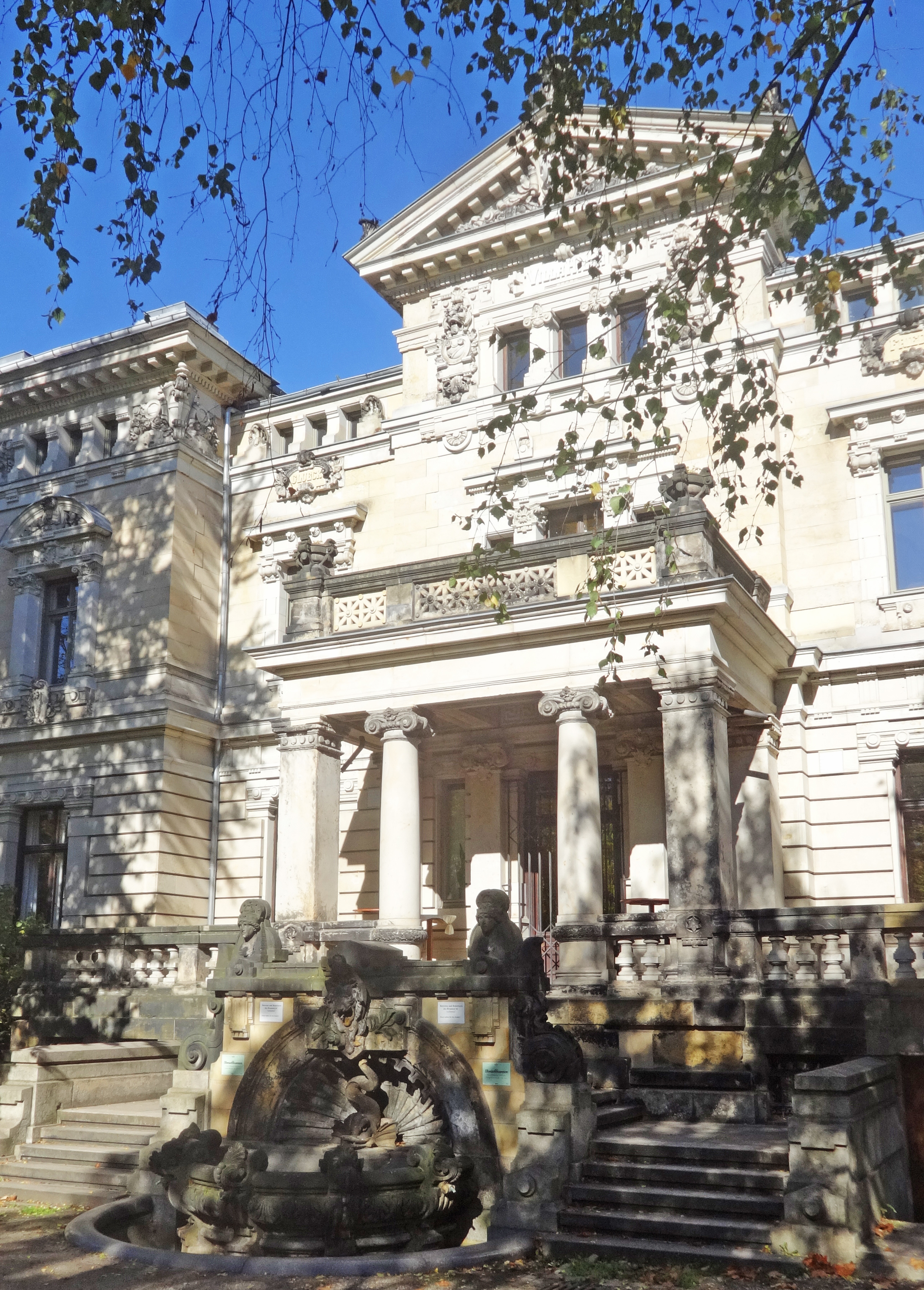
The Budde-Haus in Gohlis, Leipzig

The Budde-Haus is a socio-cultural center in the Gohlis district of Leipzig, Germany. The house was built in 1890-91 as a residence for the Bleichert family and has been used as a cultural center since 1956. It has been a listed building since 1973 and is an important example of late 19th-century architecture in Germany. Since 1993 it has been one of eleven socio-cultural centers in Leipzig.

== History ==
=== Bleichert and Mende family ===
In 1860 a gasworks and a collection of office buildings were constructed on the large site between present-day Lützowstraße and Benedixstraße. In 1880, this property was purchased by Adolf Bleichert (born 1845 in Dessau, grew up in Leipzig-Gohlis), the owner of a cable-car company. This was followed by the conversion of the office buildings into "Villa Bleichert", a home for the Bleichert family. In 1890 the old villa was demolished, and from 1890 to 1891 the "Villa Hilda" was built, named for Adolf Bleichert's wife Hildegard.

The Bleichert family had eight children, two of whom died young. In 1899, Adolf Bleichert contracted tuberculosis, and in 1901 died in a hospital in Switzerland. The Bleichert works were continued by the sons Max and Paul Bleichert, and in 1918 the family was raised to the hereditary nobility "von Bleichert". In the early 1920s the family moved out of the house.

In 1927 Karl Mende, a wholesaler for industrial glass based at the Eutritzscher Freiladebahnhof, bought the property and used it as a residence for his family, which necessitated various modifications to the buildings. These included covering the ceiling of the upper floor was enclosed in glass tiles.

During the bombing of Gohlis in 1945, the right wing and the glass dome of the house were destroyed. The Mende family continued to live there until 1952, also housing refugees. Following the arrest of Karl Mendes on the charge of forming a monopoly ("Monopolbildung"), the ownership of the property by the Mendes family came to an end. Karl Mende was later able to escape from prison in Zwickau with forged papers and fled to West Berlin.

=== Klubhaus Heinrich Budde ===
The villa officially became the property of the city of Leipzig. Between 1953 and 1954, was used as a boarding school for civil engineering students of the engineering school and then between 1954 and 1955 as a home for 80 "difficult girls". In 1956 the property was transferred to the successor company of the Bleichert-Werke, the VEB Verlade- und Transportanlagen Leipzig, for cultural use. On August 11, 1956, it was inaugurated as the "Klubhaus Heinrich Budde". The coming decades meant a lively cultural life in the house, including a library and dance events.

=== Budde-Haus ===
In January 1993, the "Klubhaus Heinrich Budde" was closed and the building restored to the grandson of Karl Mendes. Following a "Save the Budde-Haus" campaign by the citizens of Gohlis, the city of Leipzig bought the property for DM 2.4 million and donated the entire site to the newly founded Heinrich-Budde-Haus e. V., which reopened the building as a socio-cultural center.

Despite lively cultural activities and major renovations, the city of Leipzig repeatedly made plans to sell the building. After the Heinrich-Budde-Haus e. V. filed for bankruptcy in 2014, the cultural office of the city of Leipzig took over the management of the property. Following a call for tenders, the villa was re-opened as a cultural center by FAIRbund e. V. in 2017.

== Namesake of the Budde-Haus ==
Caspar Heinrich Budde was born on January 28, 1887, in Dorstfeld near Dortmund as the second oldest of eight siblings. After various training and further education courses, he was employed from April to August 1909 as a technician at the Adolf Bleichert & Co. factory in Leipzig.

In 1914 he married his wife Else (née Funke), and had two children. In 1914 the Budde family moved to Duisburg, and after the First World War, Budde founded his own transportation company. In 1921–22, Budde returned to Leipzig and resumed working for the Bleichert company as an iron designer/engineer. During the global economic crisis he became unemployed, and was later hired by the Leipzig company Mannesmann-Rohrleitungs A.G.

During an air raid watch at Mannesmann in 1943, Heinrich Budde was heard railing against the Nazi regime and reported by colleagues to the Gestapo. He was arrested and accused of hate speech, plotting a communist coup and attempting to manipulate the will of the German people. In July 1944 he was tried at the Dresden Higher Regional Court and initially sentenced to seven years in prison for undermining military force and seven years of loss of honour ("Ehrverlust"). Following an appeal by the prosecutor, he was sentenced to death on October 27, 1944, and executed on November 27, 1944.

In honour of Budde, Beaumontstrasse in Gohlis was renamed Heinrich-Budde-Strasse in 1945 and the former Bleichert villa was named the "Klubhaus Heinrich Budde" in 1956.
