= Adolf Bleichert =

German engineer, entrepreneur and pioneer of cable transport construction

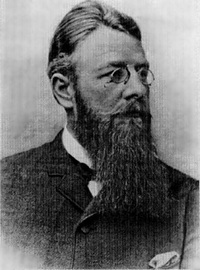
- Born: May 31, 1845; Dessau, Anhalt-Dessau
- Died: July 29, 1901 (aged 56); Davos, Switzerland
- Occupation(s): Engineer, Industrialist
- Known for: Cable car technology

Adolf Bleichert (born 31 May 1845 in Dessau, Anhalt-Dessau; † 29 July 1901 in Davos, Switzerland) was a German engineer and entrepreneur, pioneer of cable transport construction and founder of Adolf Bleichert & Co., factory for aerial tramways, Leipzig-Gohlis, which later became the world's largest cable car factory.

== Life ==
Adolf Bleichert was born as the second child of the Gohlis miller August Bleichert and his wife Wilhelmine Henriette and grew up in Gohlis, today a neighbourhood of Leipzig. He studied at the Gewerbeakademie, a forerunner of Technische Universität Berlin. After initial jobs at a company specialising in mill construction in Bitterfeld and a machine factory and iron foundry in Schkeuditz, he founded the engineering office for cable cars together with his college friend Theodor Otto, whose first success was the construction of a material ropeway in Teutschenthal. Soon after, they built a material cable car for the Sayner Hütte of the Krupp company. Otto separated from Bleichert in 1876 and worked with the Siegen cable car pioneer Julius Pohlig, who designed cable cars for use in transporting coal and ore in mines.

Bleichert then founded Adolf Bleichert & Co., Fabrik für Drahtseilbahnen, Leipzig-Gohlis, with his brother-in-law, the businessman Peter Heinrich Piel, with which he developed the basis for the construction of aerial lifts and successfully put them into practice. By 1890, the company had built well over 600 cable cars.

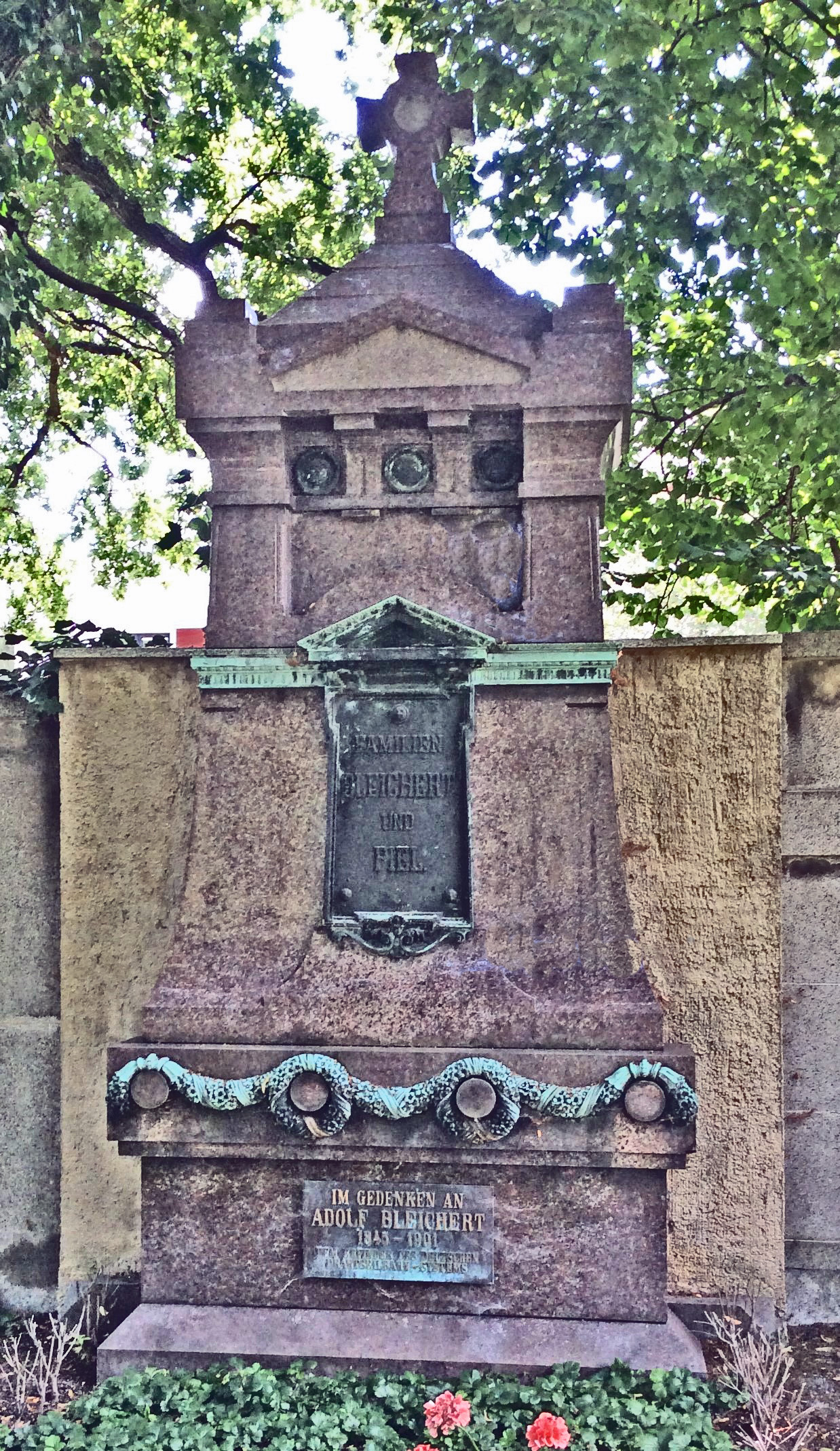
Grave of Adolf Bleichert, Leipzig (1845–1901)

Adolf Bleichert died at the age of 56 of tuberculosis during a spa stay in Davos. He was buried in the Leipzig-Gohlis cemetery. His company was successfully continued by his sons Max and Paul, who were raised to the hereditary nobility in 1918.

Adolf Bleichert joined the Verein Deutscher Ingenieure (Association of German Engineers, VDI) and the Thuringian district association of the VDI in 1869. He later joined the Saxon district association of the VDI.

== Memorial ==
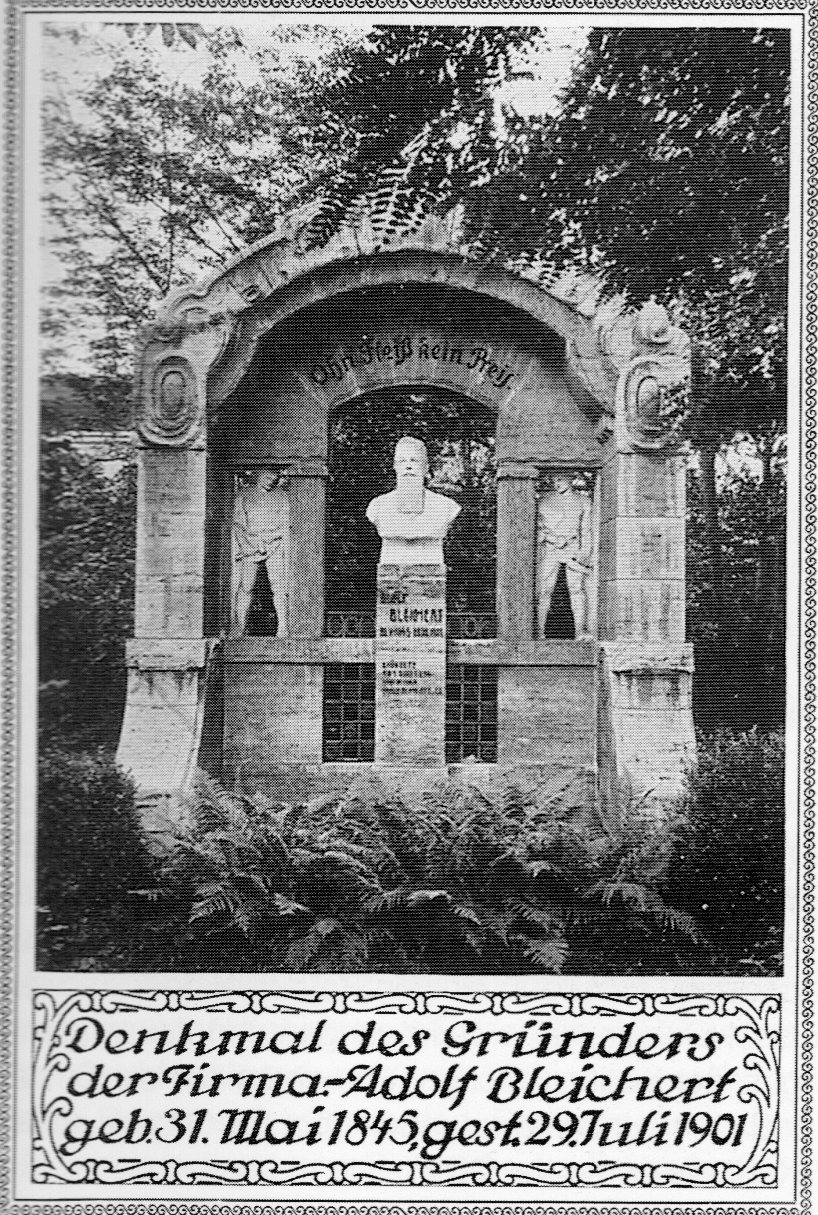
Inscription: „Ohne Fleiß kein Preis“ (No pain, no gain)

The sculptor Friedrich Walter Kunze created the Adolf Bleichert memorial, which was unveiled in 1908 on the factory premises in Leipzig-Gohlis. It was removed under communist rule on May 1, 1950.

== See also ==
- Bleichert
- Budde-Haus

== Bibliography ==
- Bleichert, Peter von (2019-10-26). Adolf Bleichert & Co.'s Wire Rope Systems (English ed.). Kindle ebooks.
- G. Dieterich: Die Erfindung der Drahtseilbahnen. Verlag Hermann Zieger, Leipzig, 1908 (Digitalisat)
- Manfred Hötzel, Stefan W. Krieg (Hrsg.): Adolf Bleichert und sein Werk. Gohliser Historische Hefte, Sax Verlag Beucha, Leipzig 2002, ISBN 978-3-934544-35-2.
- Herbert Pönicke (1955). "Bleichert, Adolf". Neue Deutsche Biographie (in German). Vol. 2. Berlin: Duncker & Humblot. pp. 298–299. (full text online).
- P. Stephan: Die Drahtseilbahnen. 2. Aufl., Verlag von Julius Springer, Berlin, 1914 (Digitalisat)
