= Gohlis Palace =

- Gohliser Schlösschen
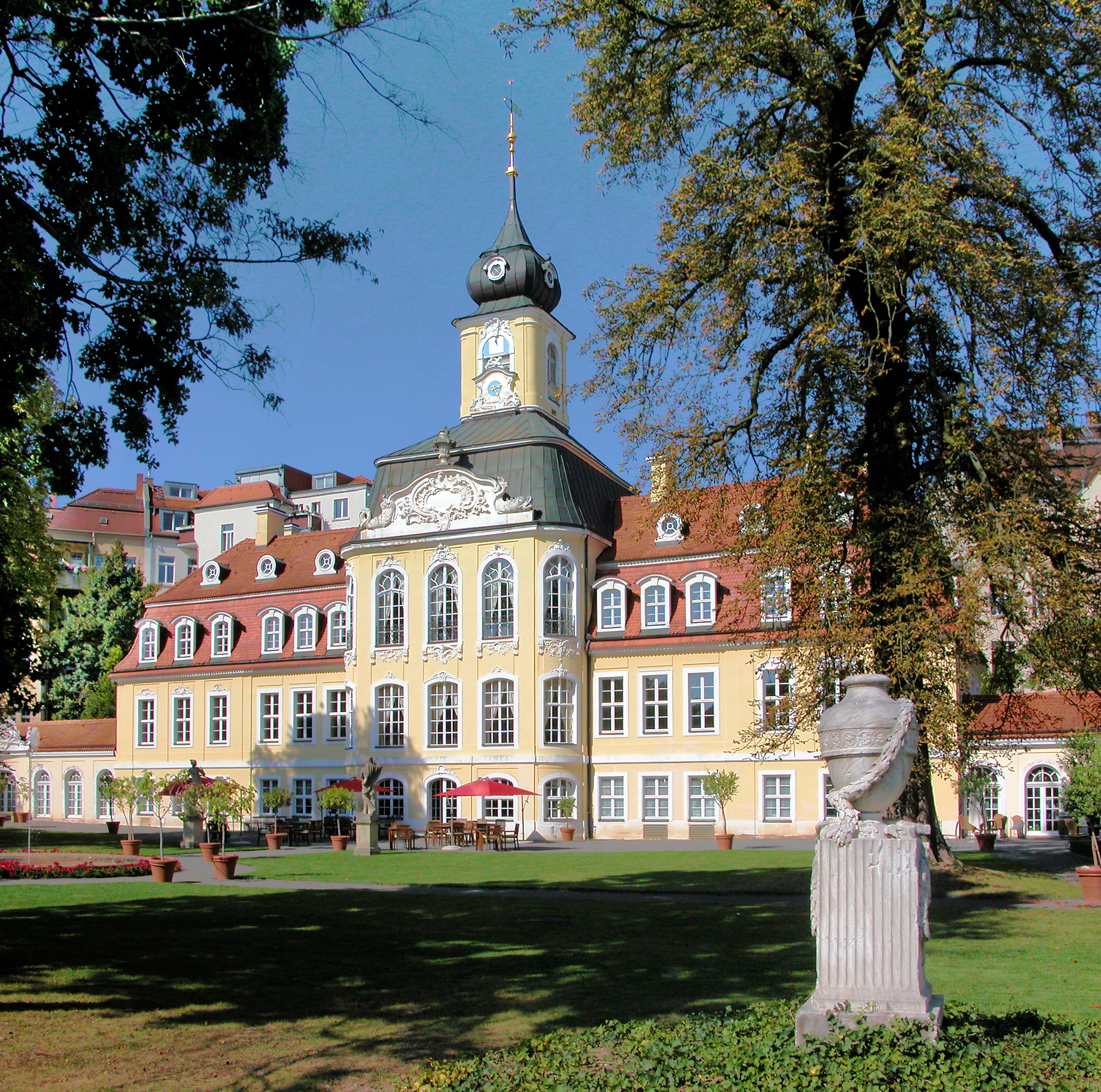
- South side (garden) (2008)
- Interactive map of the Gohlis Palace area

General information
- Type: Bourgeois country house
- Architectural style: Rococo architecture
- Location: Menckestrasse 23, Leipzig, Germany
- Coordinates: 51.356748°N 12.364222°E
- Current tenants: Gohliser Schlösschen Musenhof am Rosental gemeinnützige GmbH
- Construction started: 1755
- Completed: 1756
- Renovated: 1991-1998
- Cost: DM 16.4 million
- Client: Johann Caspar Richter (1756)

Height
- Height: 36 metres (118 ft)

Design and construction
- Architecture firm: Renovation: Ilg Friebe Nauber Architekten

Website
- https://gohliserschloesschen.de/

The Gohlis Palace (in German: Gohliser Schlösschen) is a Rococo building in the Leipzig borough of Gohlis, Germany, built as a representative bourgeois country house. It is one of the city's sights.

== Location ==
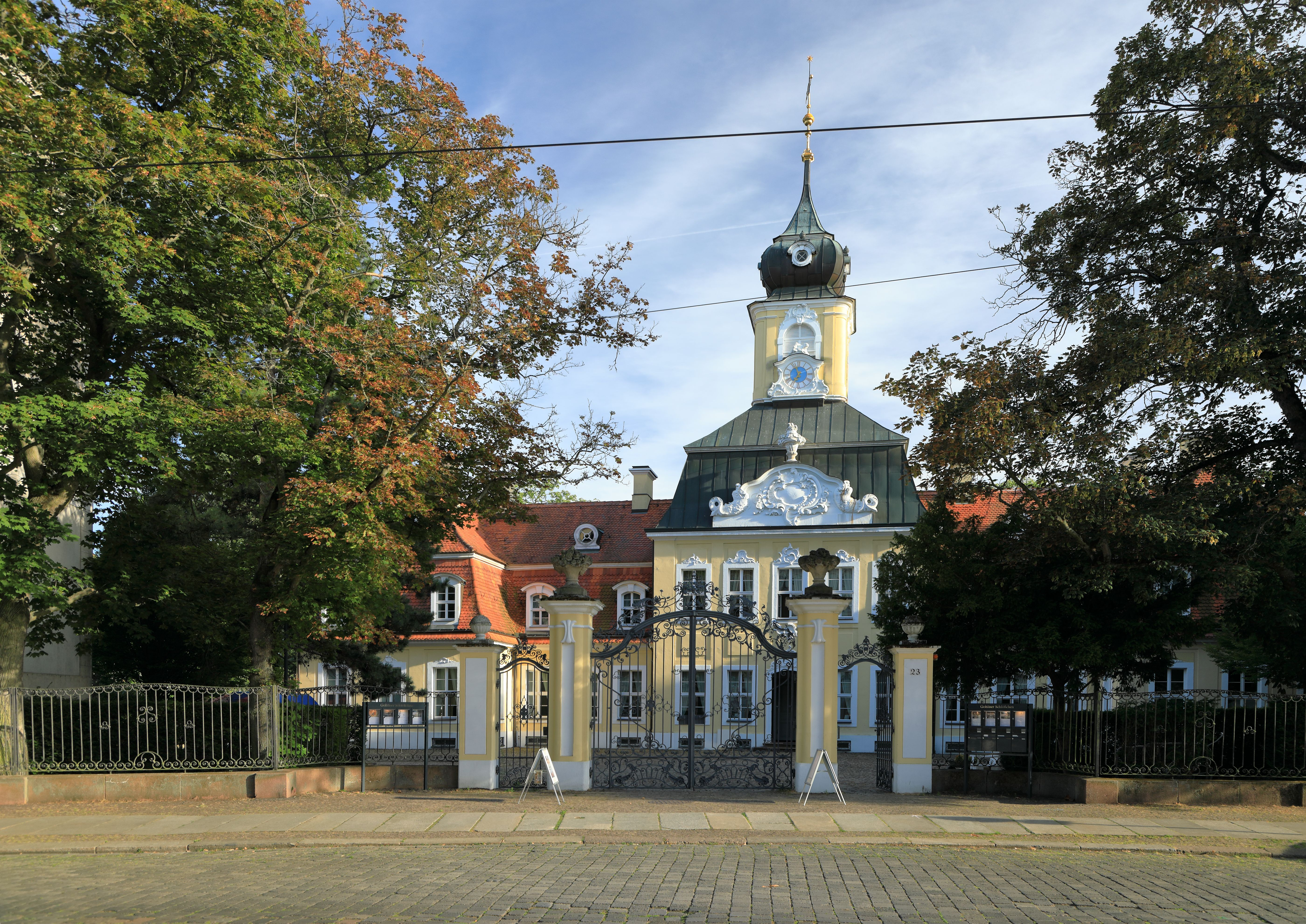
North side (courtyard side) (2022)

The plot of the Gohlis Palace stretches between the streets named Menckestrasse (courtyard side) and Poetenweg (garden side) in Leipzig-Gohlis. It is about 2 kilometres (1 mi) from the city center and only 200 metres (656 ft) from the Rosental landscape park via Turmgutstrasse and the Parthe Bridge (Parthenbrücke).

== History ==
In 1755/56, the Leipzig councillor and council architect Johann Caspar Richter (1708–1770) had a summer palace built in the then village of Gohlis, northwest of Leipzig. The plot of land on which the building was constructed was created by merging two adjacent farms that belonged to Christiana Regina Richter (1724–1780), the owner's wife. Comparative studies suggest that the Leipzig municipal architect Friedrich Seltendorff (1686–1752), who was influenced by the Dresden architect Johann Christoph Knöffel (1700–1778), provided the design.

Due to the high contribution payments that Richter, as a wealthy citizen of Leipzig, had to make during the Seven Years' War, the interior work was delayed. After Johann Caspar Richter's death in 1770, the next husband of Richter's widow, Johann Gottlob Böhme (1717–1780), professor of history at Leipzig University, completed the work. The Leipzig painter and sculptor Adam Friedrich Oeser created the paintings in the ballroom of the castle. The castle can be seen as an intellectual center during this period. Georg Joachim Göschen and Christian Gottfried Körner are said to have been guests, as was Friedrich Schiller during his stay in Gohlis in 1785.

In 1793, the Gohlis Palace was bequeathed to the city of Leipzig. During the Battle of Leipzig of 1813, it initially provided quarters for high-ranking military officers, and then served as a military hospital. In 1832, the city council sold it to the Alvensleben family, from whom it passed in the next generation to the Leipzig merchant Christoph Georg Conrad Nitzsche. In 1906, the city finally became the owner of the building.

After renovation in 1934/35, it was opened to the public as a "House of Culture" and used for cultural events. From 1951 to 1985, the Bach Archive Leipzig was also based here.

During the general renovation from 1991 to 1998, the building was restored to its 18th century condition. From 1998, the Cultural Office of the City of Leipzig ran the house. At the end of 2003, austerity measures forced its closure. Between 2004 and 2020, the Friends of Gohliser Schlösschen eV operated the complex. Since 1 April 2021, the newly founded "Gohliser Schlösschen | Musenhof am Rosental gemeinnützige GmbH" has operated the palace complex. The aim is to preserve the culturally and historically significant building and the associated baroque garden in its original structure, in strict compliance with the heritage protection requirements. At the same time, the entire palace complex is to be made accessible to as wide a public as possible. Through culturally appealing and varied event formats, flexible space options and opening times tailored to needs, the cheerful mood and lightness of the Rococo is conveyed and the Gohlis Palace is developed into a center of social life and civic responsibility. The rooms are used for concerts and theater events as well as exhibitions. The Oeser Hall on the upper floor is available for civil and non-denominational weddings, while the stone hall, which can be accessed from the gardens, provides a dignified setting for funeral ceremonies. Guided tours are held and some rooms are used as a cultural café for catering or can be booked for company or private family celebrations.

== Architecture ==
The main building of the Gohlis Palace is a three-wing complex about 40 metres (131 ft) wide with side wings just 4 metres (13 ft) long on the courtyard side. The risalit in the middle section is flat on the courtyard side and arched outwards on the garden side and is slightly divided by lesene strips. Above this rises a 36 metres (118 ft) tall tower-like structure, which is why the complex was previously called the Turmgut (Tower Manor). Because of the hillside location, in addition to the ground and upper floors on the courtyard side, there is also a base floor on the garden side. The risalits and the tower structure feature decorative Rococo elements (rocailles) .

The middle section contains three representative rooms, one above the other, facing the garden. On the ground floor is the stone or garden room, a vaulted room. Above this is the salon and on the upper floor is the ballroom. The ceiling painting in this room shows a depiction of the "Life of Psyche" by Adam Friedrich Oeser. Next to the door are two evening fantasy landscapes by the same painter. Concerts and other cultural events take place in the ballroom.

The rooms next to the halls are each reached via a simple corridor on the courtyard side and contain exhibits on the history of the house and sample furnishings, as not much of the house's original furnishings has been preserved despite its eventful history. As a bourgeois country house, the palace has no representative entrance rooms or a magnificent staircase. Due to the long period of time between the construction and the interior work of the house, the latter is no longer characterized by Rococo, but rather by Classicism.

After the garden, two single-storey extensions, each about 50 metres (164 ft) long, are attached to the main building. The eastern extension, which now serves as a café, used to house a bowling alley and a billiards room. The western extension was the orangery. The garden contains a central ornamental fountain and several statues, including the statue of Frederick Augustus I of Saxony, which stood on Königsplatz (now Wilhelm-Leuschner-Platz) until 1937 and is also a work by Adam Friedrich Oeser.

Of all the upper-class palaces and estates of the Baroque period that were scattered in and around the wealthy trading city of Leipzig, the Gohlis Palace is the last one still standing because it did not fall victim to land speculation around 1900, like many of the magnificent Baroque buildings in the city center.

== Gallery ==
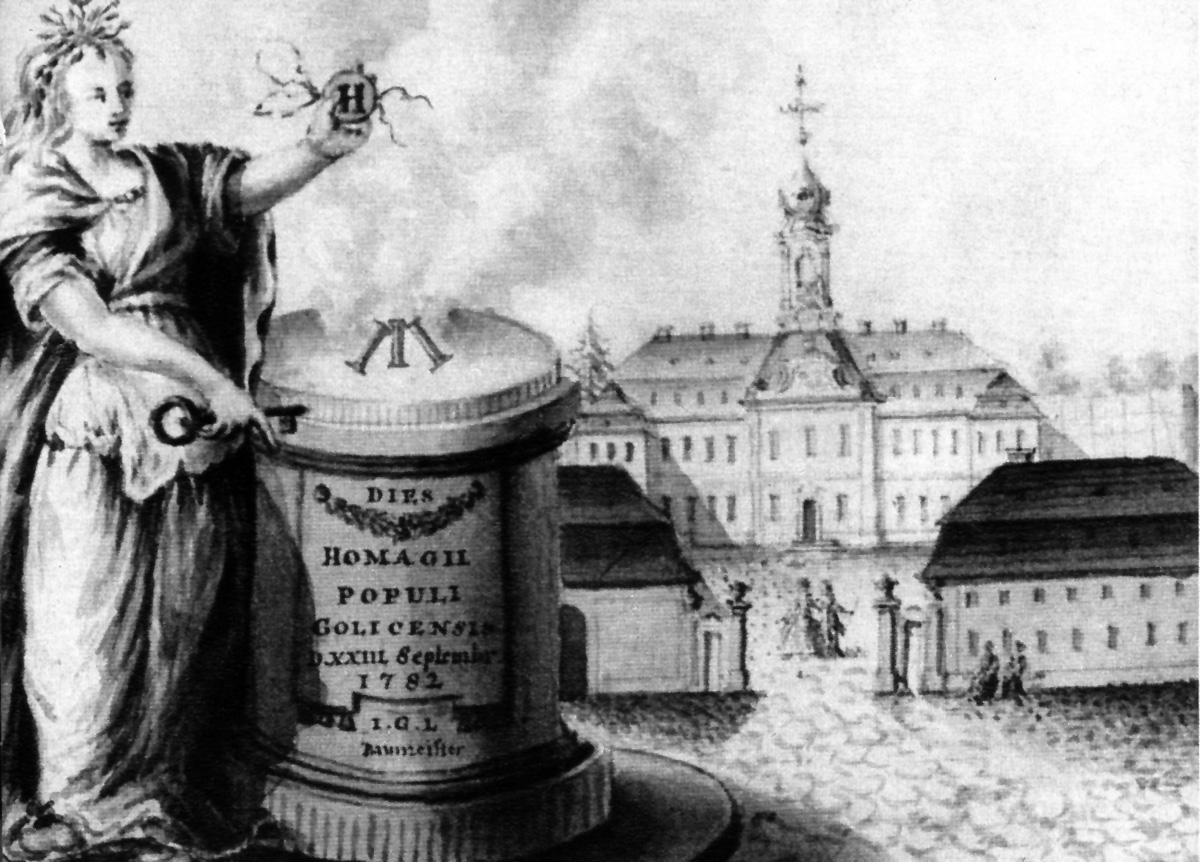
The courtyard side of the Gohlis Palace on a drawing from 1782

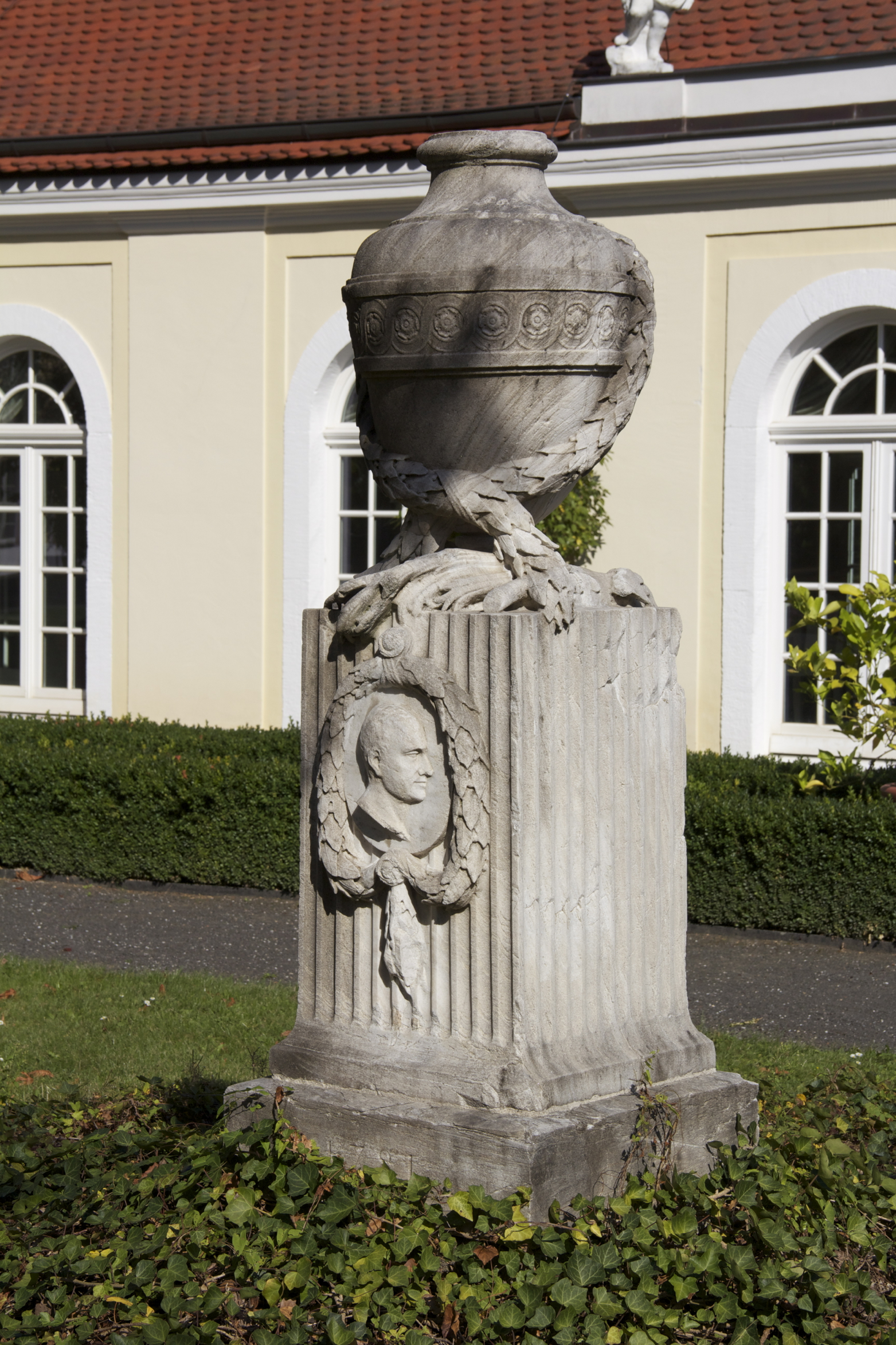
Sulzer-Gellert-Memorial by Adam Friedrich Oeser, 1781

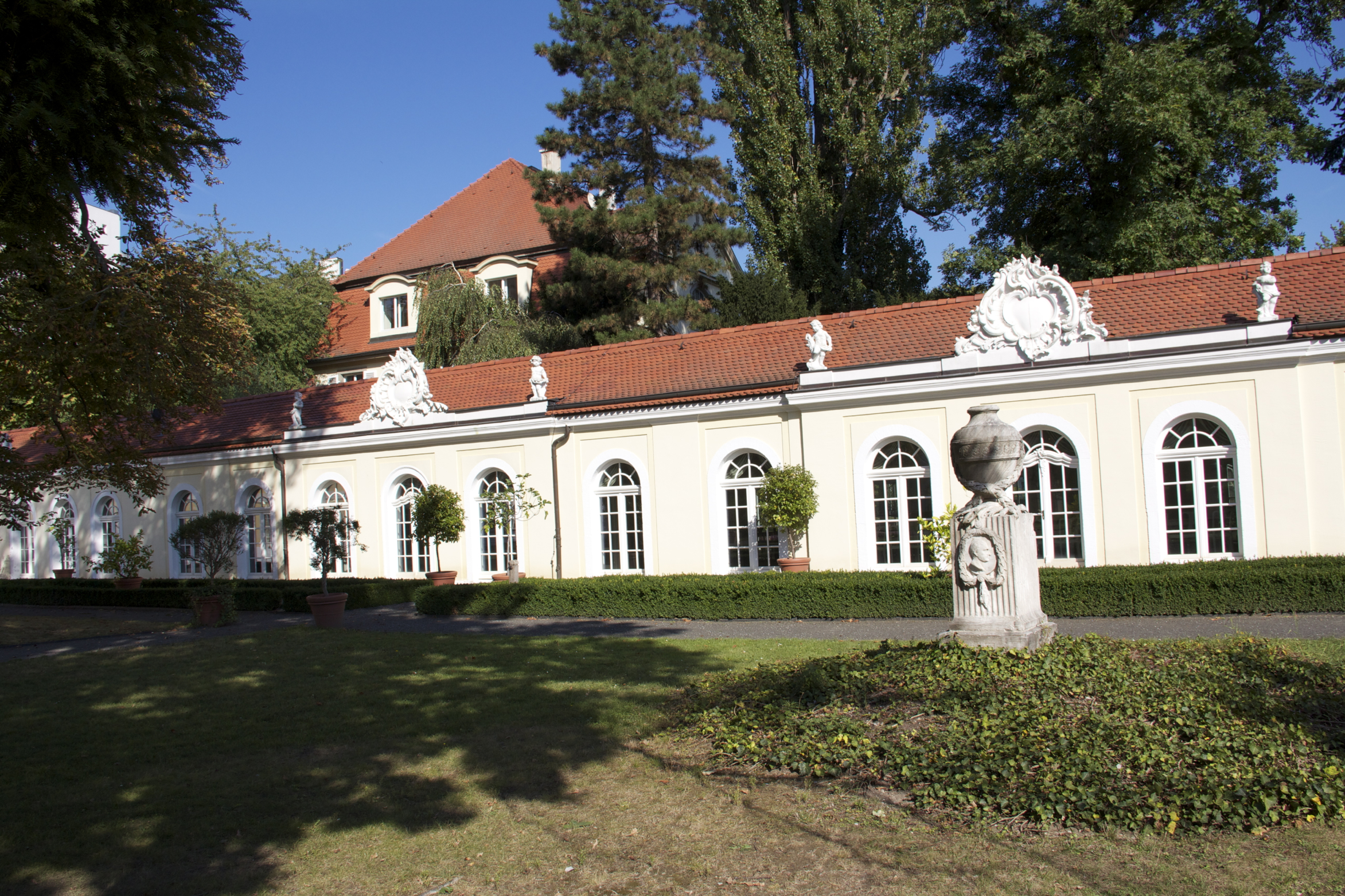
Outbuildings

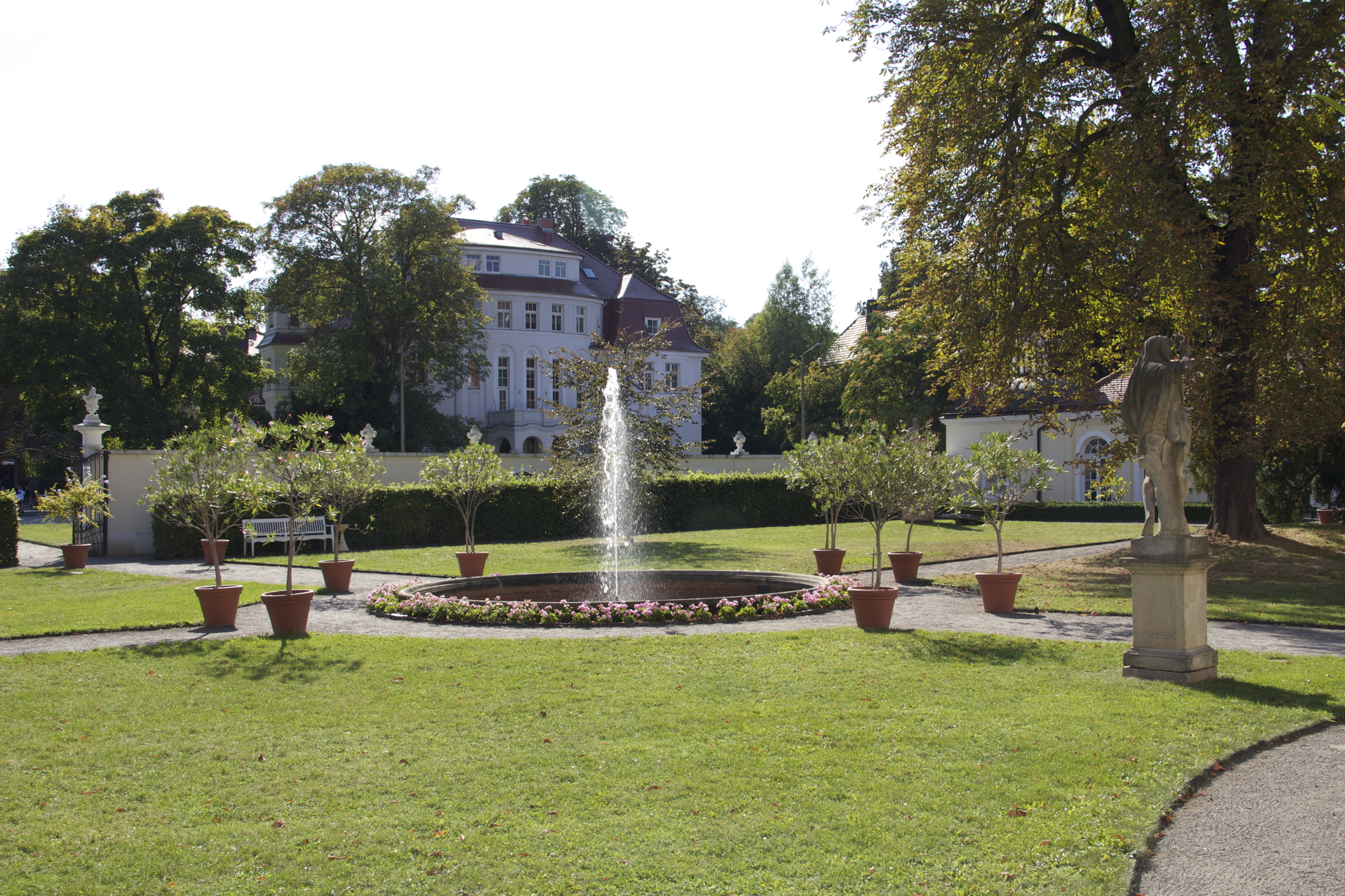
Park

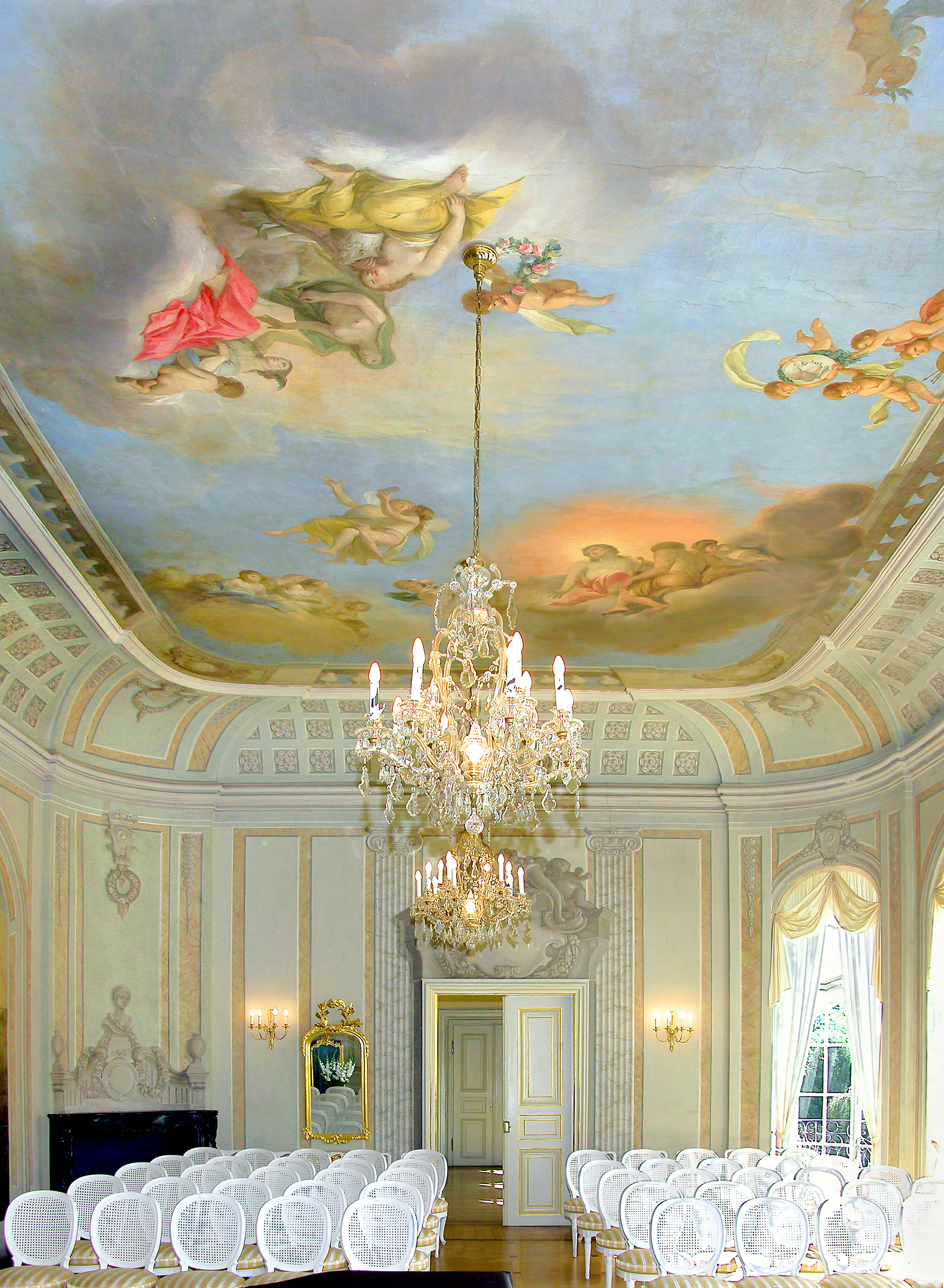
Ballroom with ceiling painting Life of Psyche by AF Oeser, completed in 1779

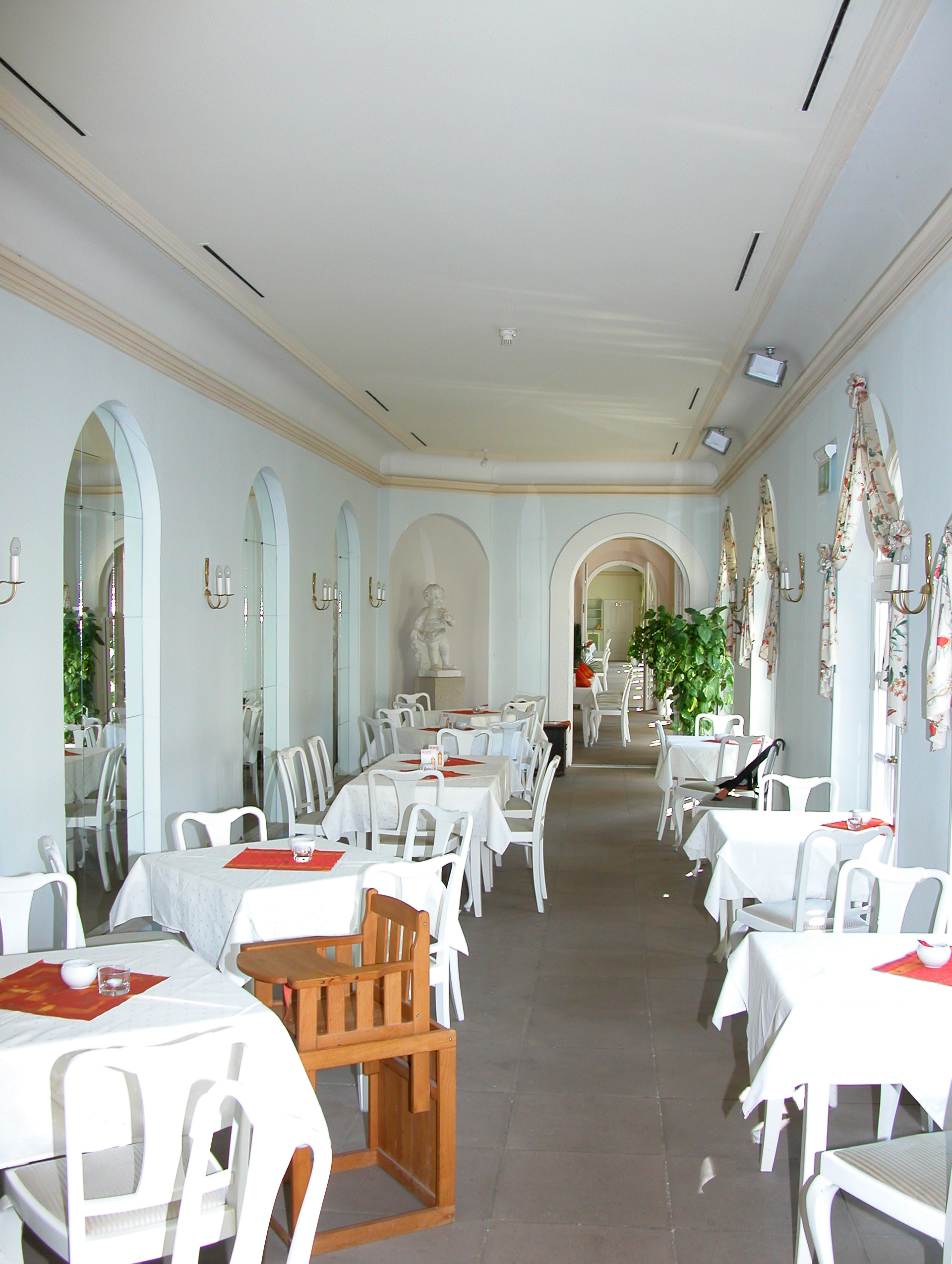
Eastern extension, formerly the bowling alley, now a café
