= Gohlis =

Locality near Leipzig, Germany

- Stadtteil of Leipzig
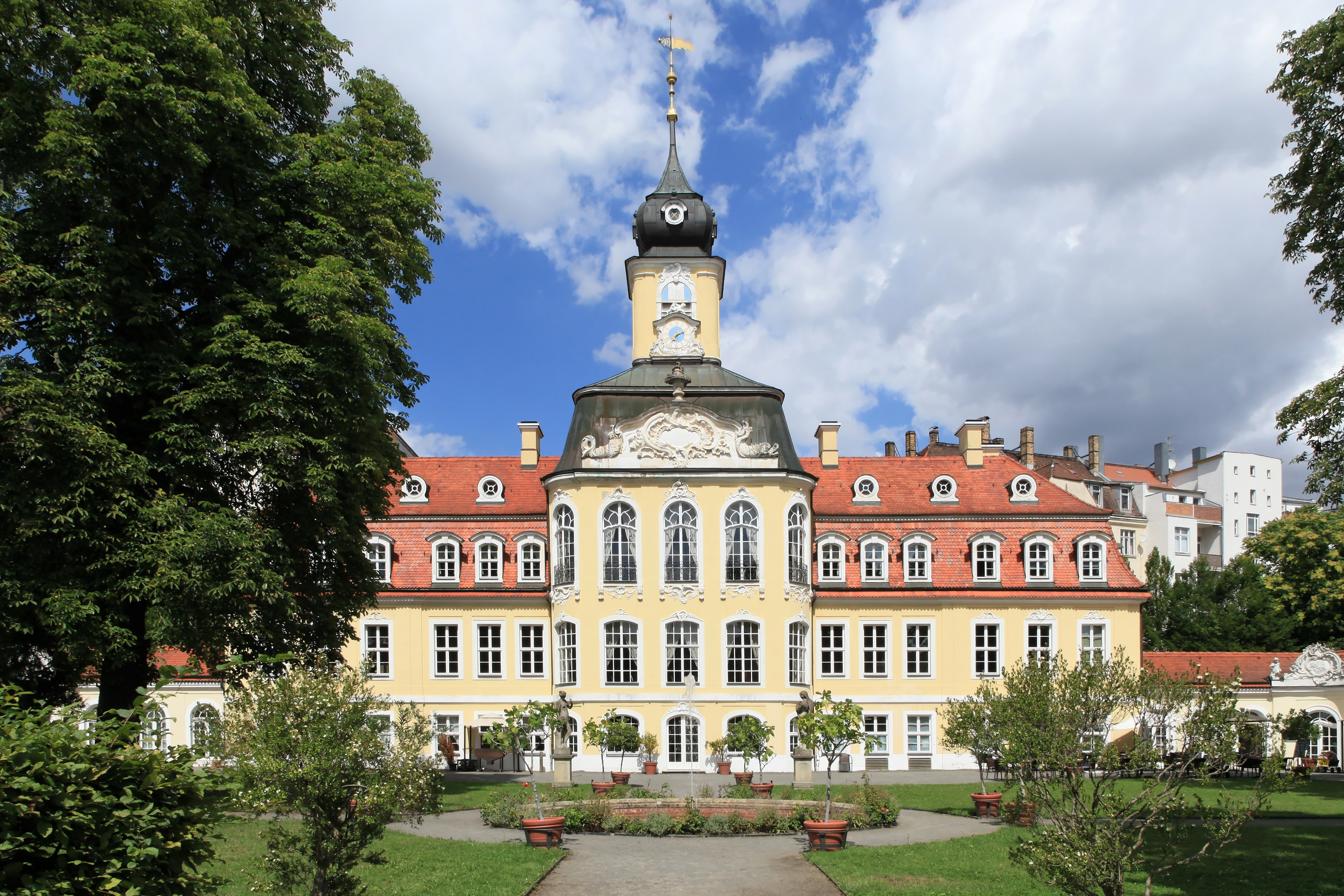
- Gohlis Palace

- Flag
- Interactive map of Gohlis
- Location within Germany Location within Saxony
- Coordinates: 51°21′40″N 12°22′0″E
- Country: Germany
- State: Saxony
- District: Urban district
- City: Leipzig

Area
  - Total: 16.86 km^{2} (6.51 sq mi)

Population (2020)
  - Total: 45,924
  - Density: 2,724/km^{2} (7,055/sq mi)
- Time zone: UTC+01:00 (CET)
  - Summer (DST): UTC+02:00 (CEST)
- Postal codes: 04157, 04155
- Dialling codes: 0341

Gohlis (German pronunciation: [ˈɡoːlɪs]) is a locality in the borough north of the city of Leipzig, Germany. Once a village and knightly estate (Rittergut), it became in 1838 a rural community (Landgemeinde). It urbanised during the Gründerzeit period of the 19th century and was incorporated into the city of Leipzig in 1890. Gohlis is now divided into three administrative localities (Gohlis-Süd, Gohlis-Mitte and Gohlis-Nord), all of which belong to the Stadtbezirk Nord of Leipzig. Dominated by residential buildings from the late-19th and first half of the 20th century, Gohlis has a population of more than 45,000 inhabitants (2020).

It is well known as the place where Friedrich Schiller wrote the first version of his Ode to Joy in 1785.

== Geography ==
The original settlement was located on the north-eastern edge of the floodplain of White Elster and Luppe and the landscape park Rosental, north of the confluence of Nördliche Rietzschke and Parthe, and south of the old Schkeuditzer Landstraße (road from Leipzig to Schkeuditz; today's Georg-Schumann-Straße). The original linear village stretched about 600 metres along the bent village road. Today's urban area is much more extensive, stretching 3.3 kilometres (2.1 mi) north-south and 2.5 kilometres (1.6 mi) west-east, covering an area of 5.32 square kilometres (2.05 sq mi). It borders on the Nordvorstadt to the south-east, Eutritzsch to the east, Möckern to the west and Wiederitzsch to the north.

== Population ==
Year	Residents
2000	32.580
2005	35.533
2010	38.592
2015	42.603
2020	45.924
2023	47.097

== History ==
=== Village ===
The village was probably founded by Slavic Sorbs in the seventh century. Early forms of the name were Golitz, Goliz or Golis. The old Sorbian root gol meant bare, barren and is possibly a description of the unforested immediate hinterland of the village. The ending -its/-itz is typical for Slavic villages.

In the course of the German expansion to the east, Flemish settlers established themselves in the region. The first documented mention is in the year 1317, in which the village grant of land to the Cistercian monastery of St. George is mentioned.

The rulers of Gohlis were the Margraves of Meissen or Landsberg, and later the Electors of Saxony from the Ernestine branch of the House of Wettin (1423–1485), then the Albertine Dukes, Electors and Kings of Saxony. Within the Saxon state, the village Gohlis belonged to the district of Leipzig.

The village Gohlis belonged to the seigneury (lordship) of the manor Gohlis, by which it was subject to patrimonial law. In 1659, Michael Heinrich Horn (1623–1681), a professor of medicine and chemistry at the Leipzig University, acquired the manor and the seigneury of Gohlis. Law professor Lüder Mencke (1658–1726) acquired the manor in 1720 and modernised the local law. Christiana Regina Hetzer (1724–1780) and her second husband, the Leipzig merchant and alderman Johann Caspar Richter (1708–1770), built a summer residence in rococo style in 1755/1756. The so-called Gohliser Schlösschen ("little palace of Gohlis") is nowadays used as restaurant and for cultural events. After Richter's death, Christiana Regina remarried, making her third husband, the historian Johann Gottlob Böhme (1717–1780) lord of the manor.

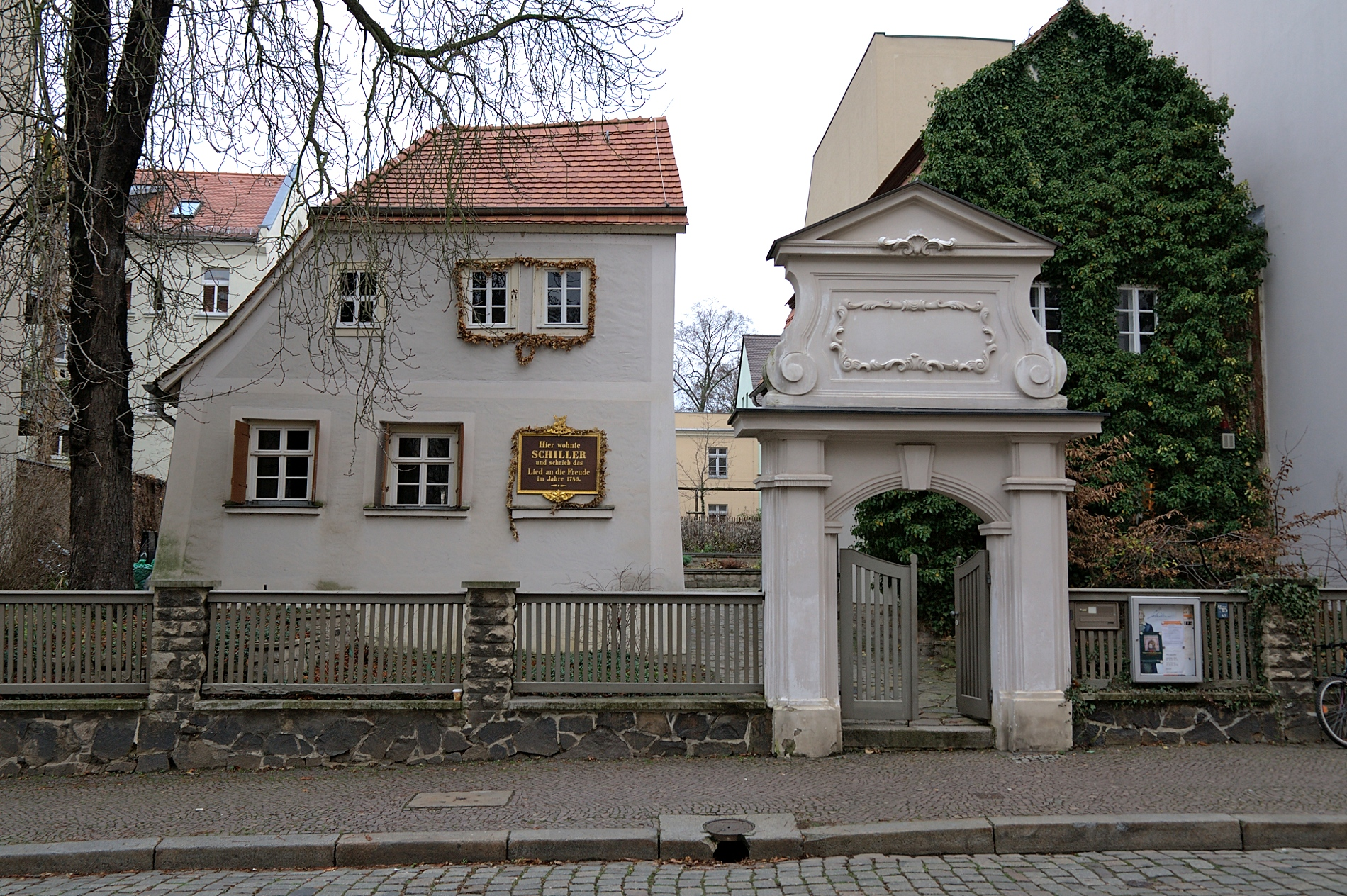
"Schillerhaus", where Friedrich Schiller stayed in Gohlis

The next owner was Christiana Regina's brother, Johann Hieronymus Hetzer (1723–1788). He was a patron of the arts, making Gohlis known as a "Court of the Muses". At the invitation of Hetzer and his friend Christian Gottfried Körner, poet and playwright Friedrich Schiller spent the summer of 1785 in Gohlis. He worked on the second act of his play Don Carlos, edited the Fiesco and wrote the first version of the Ode to Joy. The farmhouse in which Schiller stayed is the oldest house standing in Gohlis. It was built in 1700 and has hardly changed since the 18th Century. In 1841, the Leipzig Schiller Society erected a memorial site which is now the "Schillerhaus" museum.

In 1793, the city of Leipzig became the owner of the manor and acquired the underlying seigneury. Even after the city sold the manor to the House of Alvensleben in 1832, it continued to exercise the local jurisdiction. Under Saxony's 1838 Municipal Code, Gohlis was made a separate rural municipality with the right of local self-governance, ending the late-feudal system of manorialism. At that time, Gohlis comprised 54 houses and 578 inhabitants. During the Industrial Revolution, Gohlis was connected to the Magdeburg–Leipzig railway in 1840.

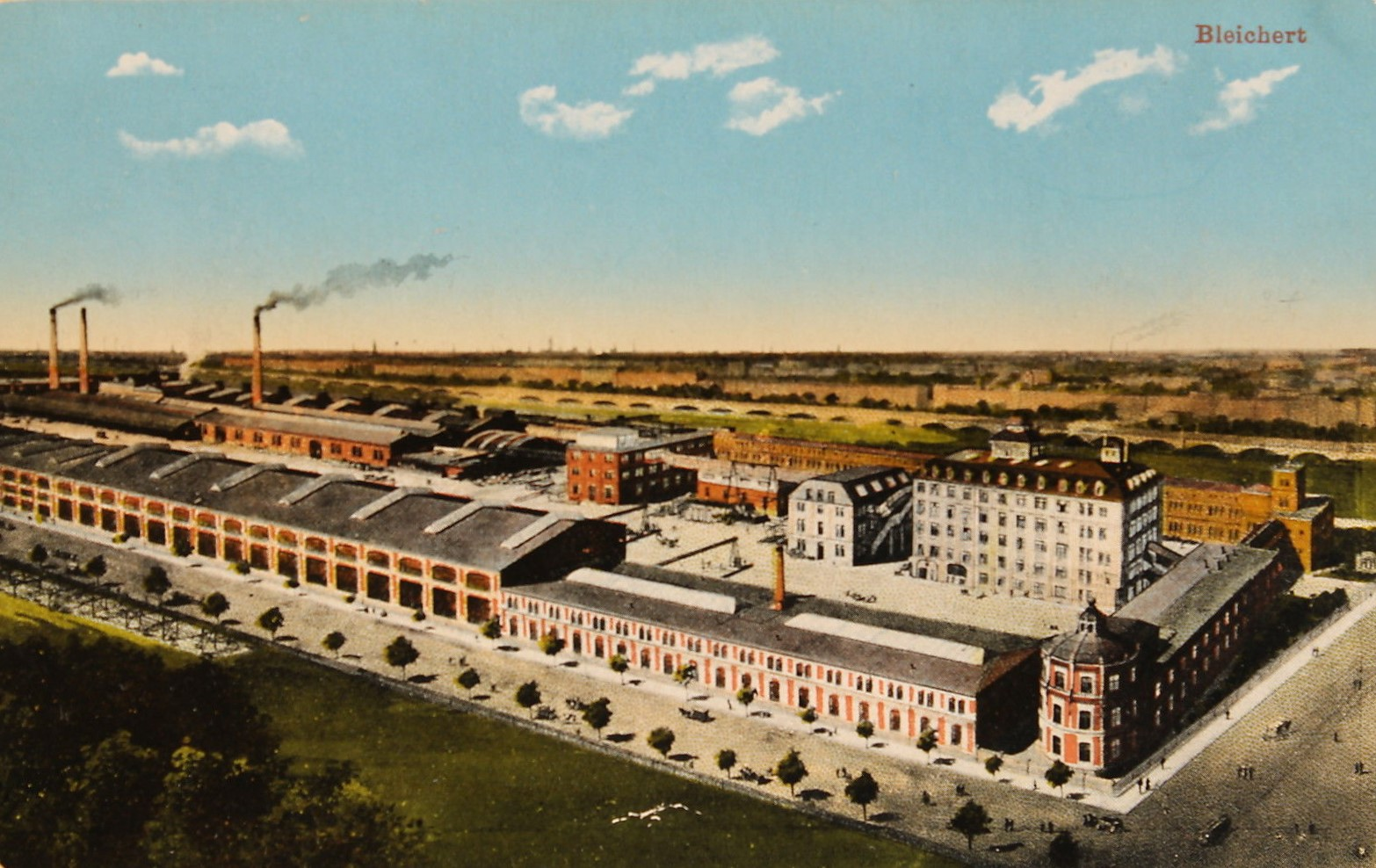
Bleichert cableway factory (1910)

During the following decades, the village experienced a rapid population growth. In 1871, it counted 5015 inhabitants, effectively becoming a suburb of the booming city of Leipzig. A new school was built in 1860–61. In 1870 Gohlis became a separate Lutheran parish, the neo-Gothic Peace Church was consecrated in 1873. In the same year, Gohlis was connected to the Leipzig tram network (then horse-drawn, electrified after 1896). Adolf Bleichert moved his cableway factory to Gohlis in 1881, becoming one of the largest and most well-known industrial plants of this place. The Royal Saxon Army developed an extensive barracks area between northern Gohlis and the neighbouring village Möckern.

=== Part of Leipzig ===
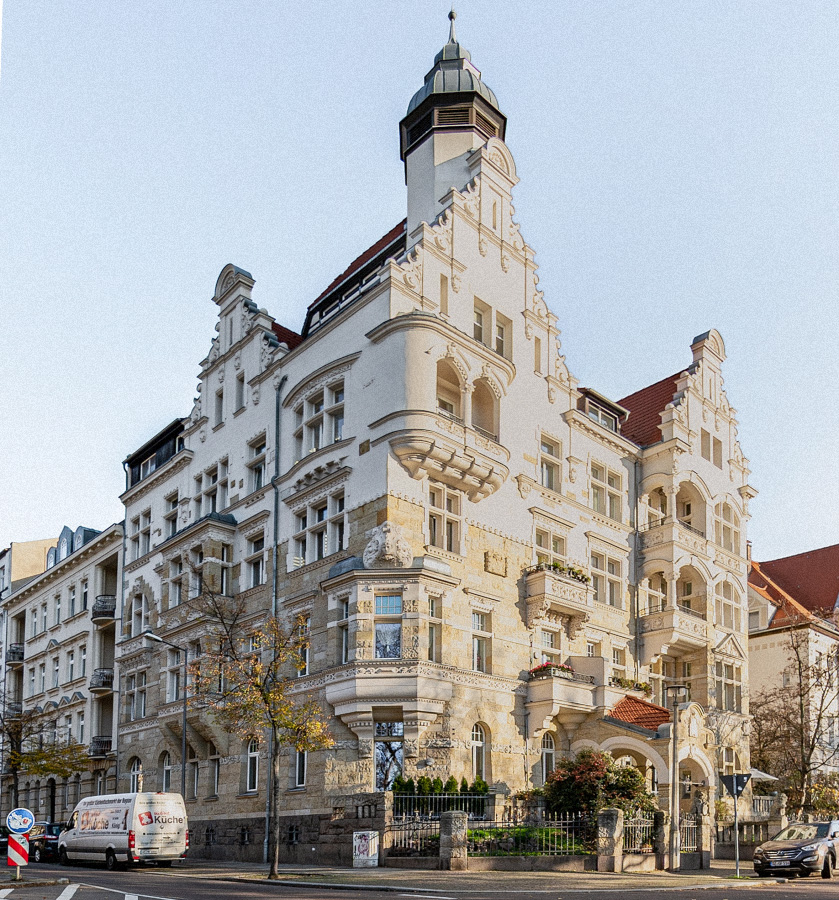
One of the 1900s urban villas

Gohlis, like several other suburbanised villages around Leipzig, was incorporated into the city in 1890. At that time, Gohlis already counted 19,312 inhabitants. After the 1898 local plan, the built-up area was extended massively to the north, beyond the railway line that had been the settlement's northern border so far. Residential neighbourhoods were developed in the following years, mostly blocks of four-storey multi-family residentials, but also areas with upscale detached houses in ornamental historicist styles or Jugendstil (Art nouveau).

The next step of residential development was the Bauhaus-style Krochsiedlung (named after German-Jewish banker Hans Kroch) built in the far-north of Gohlis in 1929/30. Planned as a satellite city for 15,000 people, only a quarter of the project was completed before being halted by the ramifications of the Great Depression and finally abandoned after the Nazi seizure of power. The modernist Church of Reconciliation (Versöhnungskirche), intended as the centre of that satellite city, was consecrated in 1932. One year later, Gohlis counted 54,581 inhabitants. Instead of Bauhaus-style apartment blocks, housing development was resumed in the 1930s with more conventional single-family and duplex houses. During the Allied airstrikes of 1943-45, Gohlis suffered some damages, but was less affected than other parts of the city.

Under the communist rule in East Germany, residential development was complemented by 1960s blocks of housing cooperatives and a minor Plattenbau estate built at the northern end of Gohlis in the 1980s. Most of the old building stock deteriorated. After the German reunification in 1990, almost all industrial plants closed down. Since then, Gohlis is dominated by residential use, small-scale services and retail. The shopping centers Gohlis-Arkaden, Gohlis-Center and Gohlis-Park were built during the 1990s. At the same time, most of the old buildings were renovated, making Gohlis again one of the most coveted residential areas of Leipzig. In the 2010s, it experienced another building boom by urban consolidation. From 32,500 inhabitants in 2000, the population rose to more than 45,000 in 2020.

== Traffic ==
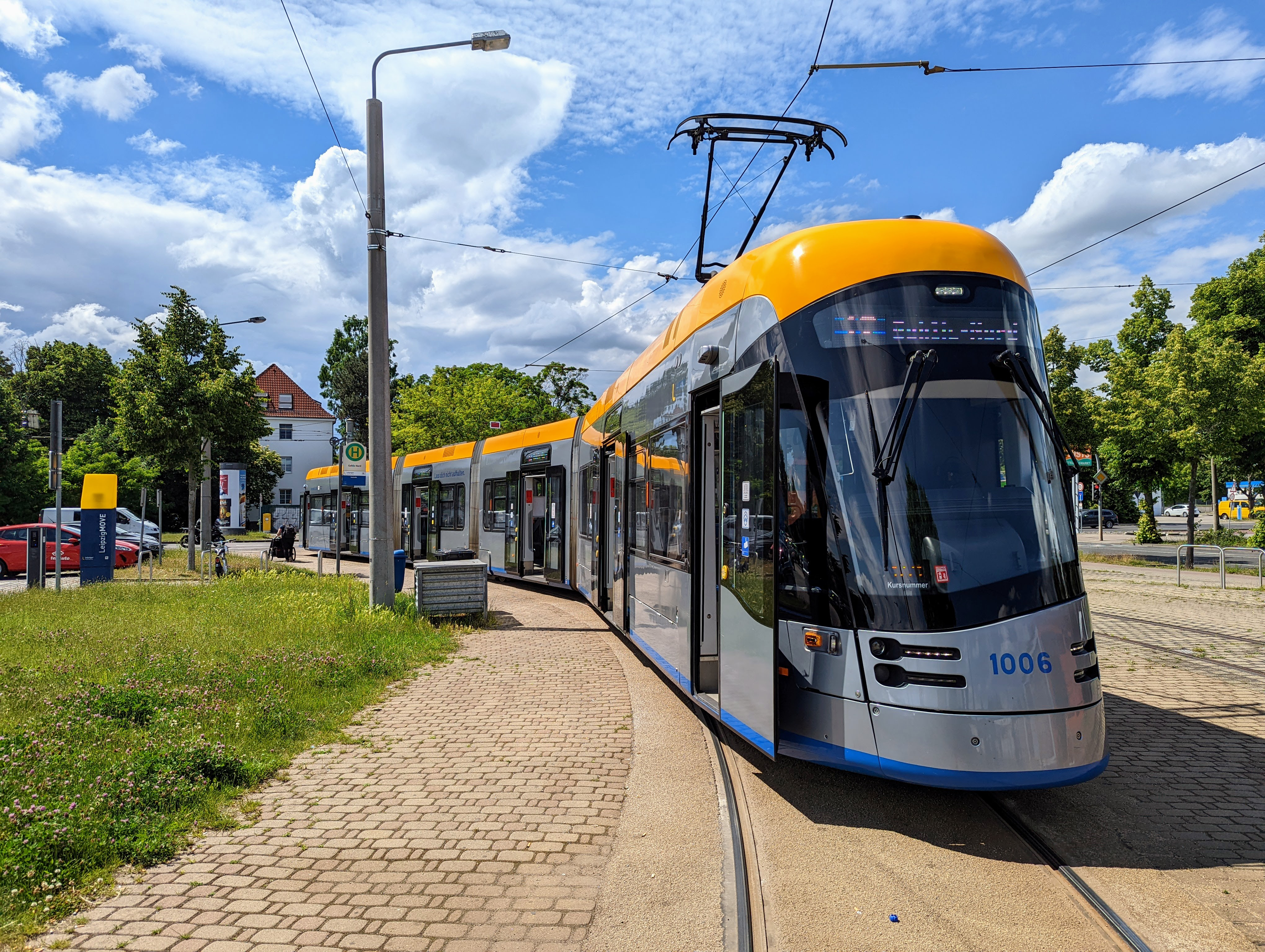
Tram at Gohlis Nord (2022)

In Gohlis, there are the S-Bahn stations Gohlis and Coppiplatz, which are served by lines S1, S3 and S10 of the S-Bahn Mitteldeutschland. The tram lines 4 (final stop Gohlis, Landsberger Strasse) and 12 (Gohlis-Nord) run parallel to each other in a north-south direction through Gohlis. They are crossed at Georg-Schumann-Strasse by lines 10 and 11, which run northwest-southeast. All of the above lines connect Gohlis with Leipzig city center. Bus lines 80 and 90 provide frequent cross-connections to the eastern and northwestern neighbourhoods. Highly frequented axes of motorized vehicles are Max-Liebermann-Strasse (part of the Bundesstraße 6), Georg-Schumann-Strasse, Platnerstrasse, Lindenthaler/Landsberger Strasse and Lützow-/Virchowstrasse.

== Points of interest ==
- Budde-Haus

== Personalities ==
=== Sons and daughters of the place ===
- Karl Wittgenstein (1847–1913), entrepreneur in Austria-Hungary
- Rudi Opitz (1908–1939), photographer and chemist, opponent and victim of National Socialism

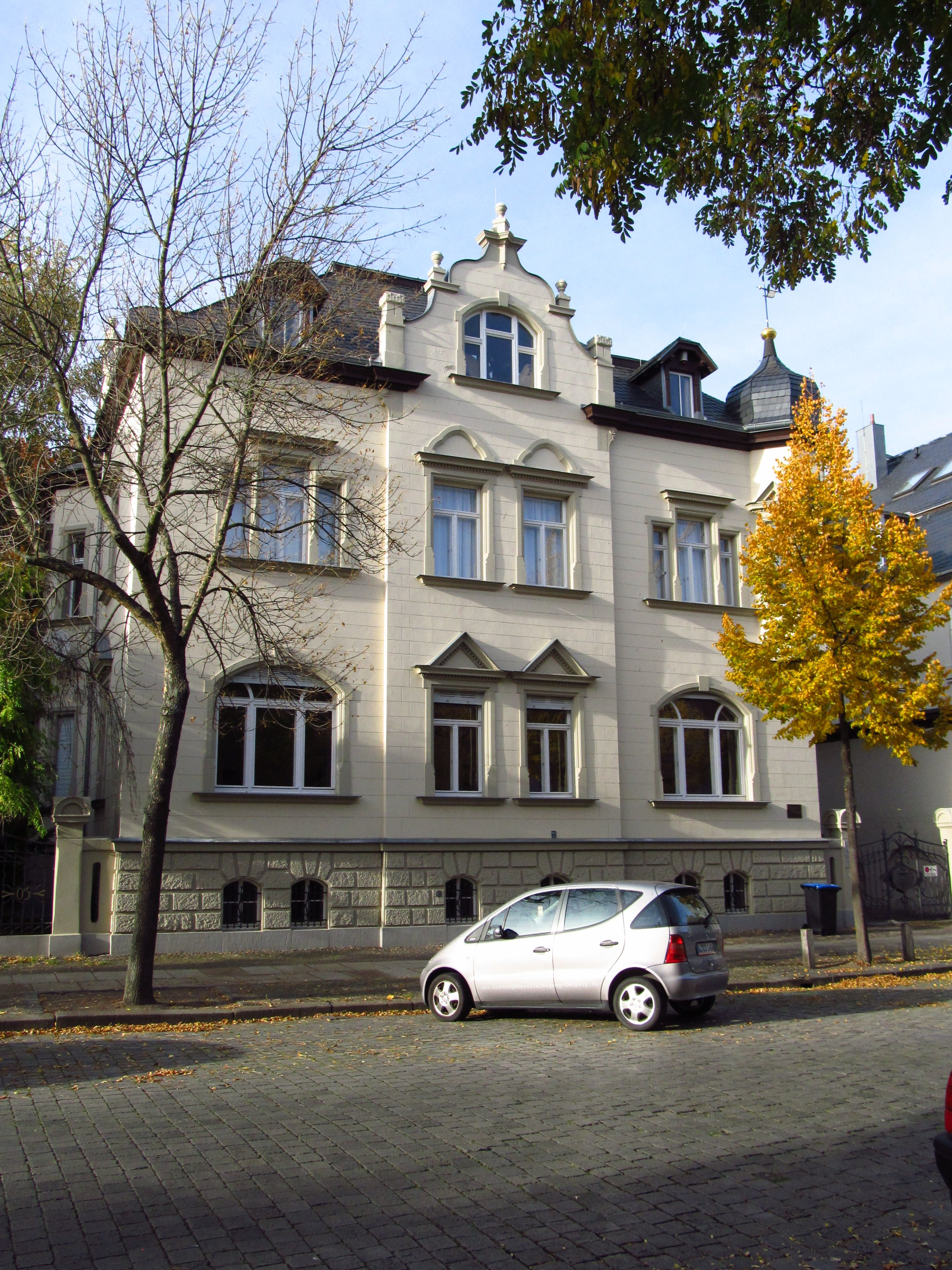
Villa Tübke, named after the painter, at Springerstrasse

=== Personalities associated with Gohlis ===
- Johann Gottlob Böhme (1717–1780), historian, owner of the Gohlis Castle
- Friedrich Schiller (1759–1805), poet, had a stay in what is now Schiller House in 1785
- Adolf Bleichert (1845–1901), engineer and industrial pioneer
- Nathan Söderblom (1866–1931), Protestant theologian, lived in Gohlis in 1913/14
- Hans Kroch (1887–1970), banker, financier of the Kroch settlement in Gohlis
- Max Schwimmer (1895–1960), painter and graphic artist, lived in Gohlis
- Georg Maurer (1907–1971), writer, lived in Gohlis
- Helmut Schreiber (1925–1995), actor, lived in Gohlis
- Erich Loest (1926–2013), writer, lived in Gohlis
- Werner Tübke (1929–2004), painter and graphic artist, lived in Gohlis

== See also ==
- Budde-Haus
- Church of Reconciliation
- Gohlis Palace
- Krochsiedlung
- Schillerhaus
