= Kroch High-rise =

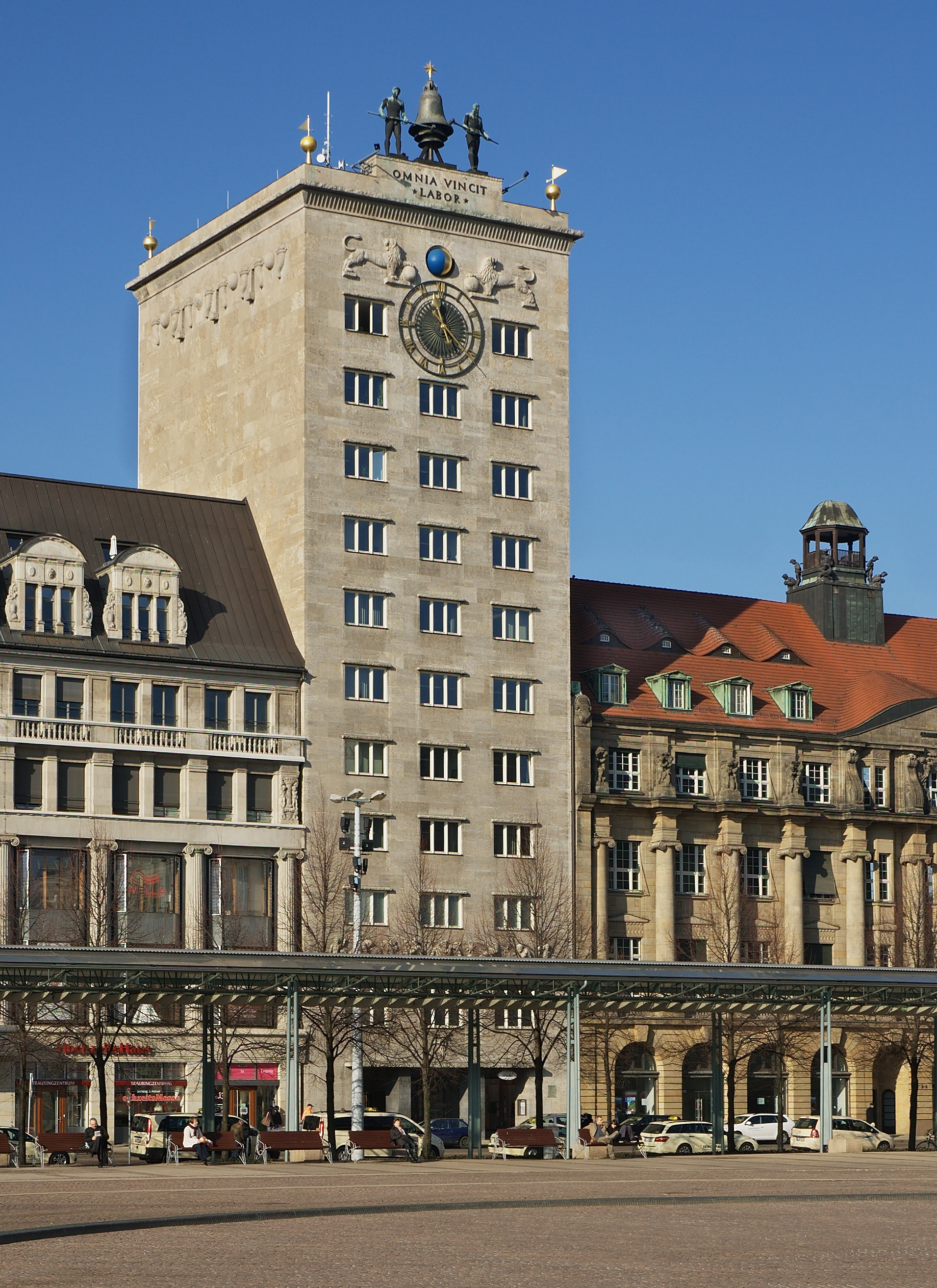
- Interactive map of the Kroch High-rise area
- Alternative names: Krochhochaus

General information
- Status: Completed
- Type: Reinforced concrete high-rise
- Location: Goethestrasse 2 Leipzig, Germany
- Coordinates: 51.339864°N 12.38°E
- Construction started: 1927
- Completed: 1928
- Opening: 1 August 1928

Height
- Roof: 43 m (141 ft)

Technical details
- Floor count: 12

Design and construction
- Architect: German Bestelmeyer
- Developer: Hans Kroch

The 43 m (141 ft) tall Kroch high-rise in Leipzig was the first high-rise building in the city. It was built in 1927/28 as the headquarter of the Kroch Banking House, a private bank of the German-Jewish banker Hans Kroch (1887–1970), and is located on the west side of Augustusplatz. It is topped by a clock and two buff sentries modelled after the St Mark's Clocktower in Venice.

In the 1926 architectural competition organized by Bankhaus Kroch together with the Leipzig City Council, the architect German Bestelmeyer (1874–1942) took one of the two second places. The building was so controversial that the four upper levels of the twelve-storey building were just a wooden mock-up for a time, and then a film simulation. The approval was finally granted on 16 December 1927. The building opened on 1 August 1928.

The outstanding feature of the high-rise and thus the landmark of Augustusplatz is the striking mechanism on the roof, which consists of three bells. The bells are struck by two 3.3 m (11 ft) tall bellmen. Below the bells is the Latin inscription OMNIA VINCIT LABOR (Work conquers all). Below this is the display of the moon phases flanked by two relief depictions of lions, which take up the entire front section of the 12th floor. There are therefore windows on the 12th floor only at the back of the building. The 11th floor only has two windows instead of the three used on the other floors, between which there is a tower clock with a dial 4.3 m (14 ft) in diameter.

The Kroch bank was aryanized in Nazi Germany. Kroch was arrested in the Kristallnacht in Leipzig on 10 November 1938 and deported to the concentration camp. In 1970, he died in Israel.

In 1938 the Kroch High-rise was taken over by the Industrial and Commercial Bank, (Industrie- und Handelsbank, state-owned in East Germany) and later it was used by various economic, scientific and social institutions.

From 2007 to 2009, the building had been extensively renovated for 5.7 million euros. It houses several institutes of the Leipzig University and its Egyptian Museum. The arcade gallery named Theaterpassage is going through the house from Goethestrasse to Ritterstrasse.

== See also ==
- Architecture of Leipzig
- List of tallest buildings in Leipzig
- History of the Jews in Leipzig

== Literature ==
- Leonhardt, Peter (2007). Moderne in Leipzig. Architektur und Städtebau 1918 bis 1933 [Modernism in Leipzig. Architecture and Urbanism 1918 to 1933] (in German). Leipzig: Pro Leipzig. pp. 31–35. ISBN 978-3-936508-29-1.
- Hocquél, Wolfgang (2023). Architekturführer Leipzig. Von der Romanik bis zur Gegenwart (in German). Leipzig: Passage Verlag. pp. 120–122. ISBN 978-3-95415-128-8.
