= Yehoshua Leib Diskin =

Lithuanian rabbi (1818–1898)

Rabbi Moshe Yehoshua Yehudah Leib Diskin
- משה יהושע יהודה לייב דיסקין
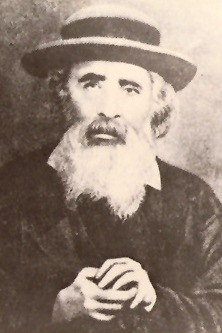
- Title: Maharil Diskin

Personal life
- Born: December 8, 1818 Grodno, Russian Empire
- Died: January 23, 1898 (aged 79) Jerusalem, Mutassarifate of Jerusalem (Syrian provinces), Ottoman Empire
- Buried: Mount of Olives Jewish Cemetery
- Spouse: Sarah Sonia Diskin (second wife)
- Children: Yitzchak Yerucham Diskin
- Parent: Binyamin Diskin (father)
- Dynasty: Diskin family
- Occupation: Rabbi

Religious life
- Religion: Judaism
- Denomination: Perushim

Jewish leader
- Organisation: Diskin Orphanage
- Yahrtzeit: 29 Tevet
- Dynasty: Diskin family

Moshe Yehoshua Yehuda Leib Diskin (1818–1898), also known as the Maharil Diskin, was a leading rabbi, Talmudist, and Biblical commentator. He served as a rabbi in Łomża, Mezritch, Kovno, Shklov, Brisk, and, finally, Jerusalem, after moving to Eretz Yisrael in 1878. He opened what today is known as the Diskin Orphan Home in 1881.

== Biography ==
Yehoshua Leib Diskin was born on December 8, 1818, in Grodno, then part of the Russian Empire. His father, Binyamin Diskin, was rabbi of that city, then Volkovisk, and later Łomża.

He married Hinda Rachel, daughter of Rabbi Broder, and lived with his father-in-law in Wolkowitz. He received semikhah (rabbinic ordination) at the age of 18, and inherited his father's rabbinate of Łomża at the age of 25.

Diskin's second wife, Sarah Sonia Diskin, was known as the "Brisker Rebbetzin". She had a very strong mind, and came from a prestigious family descended from Yechezkel Landau (the "Nodah bi-Yehudah") and Joshua Zeitlin. She died in 1907. Diskin's brother Avraham Shmuel—born 1827 in Łomża, who later became a rabbi himself—pre-deceased him.

== Rabbinic career ==
In 1878, Diskin left his rabbinical position in Brest-Litovsk and moved to Ottoman Palestine, where he became recognized as a leading rabbinic figure in the Ashkenazi community of Jerusalem. In the 1880s, Diskin was offered the position of Chief Rabbi of New York City, which he declined. Diskin established a yeshiva by the name of Ohel Moshe (lit. 'Tent of Moses'). He held the line against attempts by maskilim (Jewish Enlightenment) to introduce secular institutions to Jerusalem. His son was Yitzhak Yerucham Diskin.

== Diskin Orphanage ==
The city's large religious community was then living under near impossible conditions. The persecution and disease from which the Jews of the Holy Land suffered moved Diskin to open a home for orphans in the Old City, after bringing needy children into his own home. The Diskin Orphanage (initially known as the Diskin Orphan Home) was formally established in 1881. From the Jewish Quarter, it moved to Street of the Prophets outside the walls of the Old City. Diskin's second wife, Sarah (Sonia Rotner), brought 40,000 rubles into the marriage which was used for the support of this institution.

== Death and legacy ==
Diskin died on January 23, 1898 (29 Tevet 5658). He is buried on the Mount of Olives in East Jerusalem. Diskin Street in the Sha'arei Hesed neighbourhood is named after him.

== Bibliography ==
- Valakh (ha-Kohen), Shalom Me'ir ben Mordekhai; Allswang, Yocheved (2004). The Seraph of Brisk: The Life of the Holy Gaon Rabbi Yehoshua Leib Diskin. Tevunah Publishers. p. 788. ISBN 1583307087.
