= Baruch Schick of Shklov =

- Born: Baruch ben Jacob Schick; 1744; Shklov, Polish-Lithuanian Commonwealth
- Died: 1808; Prussia
- Occupation(s): rabbi, author

Baruch Schick of Shklov (1744–1808) was a Polish–Lithuanian-born rabbi, author, scholar, talmudist, physicist, and scientist. He is famous for having translated many scientific works into Hebrew upon the request of the Vilna Gaon. He wrote about topics ranging from medicine to hygiene, and was known as one of the many pioneers of the Haskalah movement (Jewish Age of Enlightenment). He served as a dayan in the communities of Minsk and Slutsk throughout his life. Baruch descended from the famous Jewish families of Schick and Ginzberg. He was acknowledged as the first Jew to translate from English to Hebrew.

== Early life (1744–1764) ==
Baruch ben Jacob Schick was born in 1744 in the town of Shklov. His father served as the rabbi there. His uncle, Arye Leib Ginzberg was one of the foremost halakhists of his generation. In fact, much of Schick's family consisted of some of the great rabbinic scholars in Byelorussia. At a young age, he began to follow the path of his ancestors, and study the Talmud under his father's guidance.

Later in 1760, Schick moved to the city of Minsk and joined the elite society of shivah keru'im, reserved for only the leaders of the community and scholars. There, he worked his way up the hierarchy of the society. Eventually in 1764, Schick was given ordination by the Rabbi Avraham ben David Katzenellenbogen. He later served as a dayan in Minsk.

While he was in Minsk, he gained a desire for learning.

== Interest in the Sciences ==
When Schick was a young boy, he developed a fascination of the sciences. According to his second written testimony written in Berlin, "When I was still in the home of my father, the famous rabbi and scholar, and we used to study together the Talmud with the commentaries of Rashi, Tosafot, and codes, day and night, my soul longed to lift up the crown of Israel, and to translate books into the Hebrew language on every discipline and science. But the vicissitudes of time overtook me, and these thoughts of mine came to an end...due to my dislocation from one home to another, and from one city to another."

He was a defender of the importance of scientific knowledge and gives the biblical example of Joshua using geometry to divide up the tribes.

After Schick moved to Minsk, he began to write Hebrew books on science.
