= Chaim Eitingon =

Chaim Eitingon (11 December 1857 – 24 December 1932) was a fur merchant and philanthropist in Leipzig.

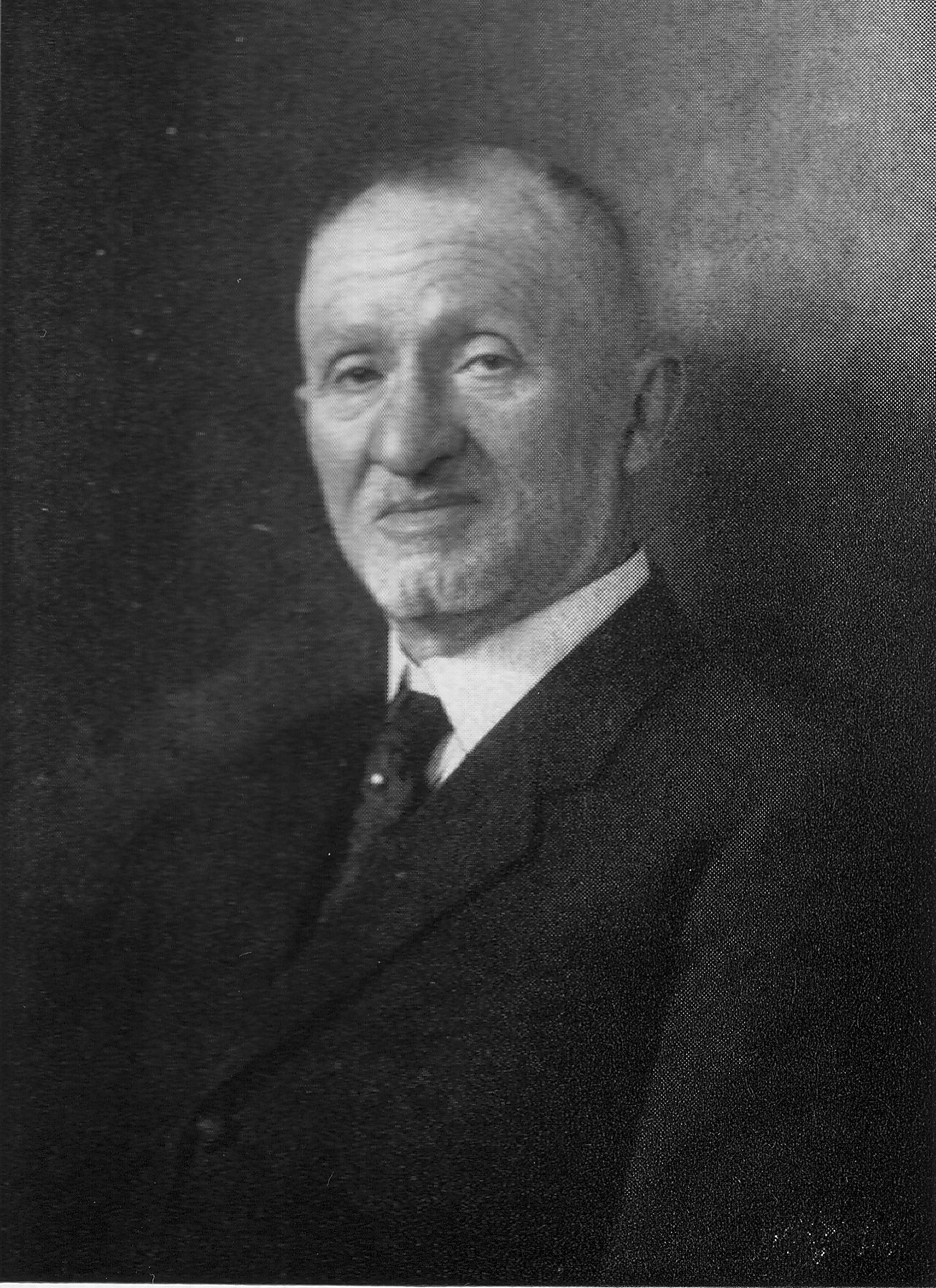
Chaim Eitingon in 1928

== Life ==
Born to Jewish parents, Chaim Eitingon was born on 11 December 1857 in Shklow in what was then the Pale of Settlement. In 1882, he married Alexandra Lifschitz (1 August 1861 – 30 November 1929), a Hasidic woman four years his junior, with whom he had four children (Esther, Fanny, Waldemar, and Max). In the same year, he founded the fur trading company Ch. Eitingon in Moscow, and just one year later, he opened a branch at Brühl 37–39 in Leipzig. He was one of the few Jewish merchants whom the Tsar continued to allow to reside in Moscow after the pogroms of 1882. He commuted between Leipzig and Moscow during this time In 1903, he returned to his headquarters in Moscow, which, however, was liquidated in 1914 due to business relations with wartime enemy Germany. After the October Revolution, Eitingon finally relocated his headquarters to Leipzig in 1917. His family lived at Döllnitzer Straße 9 (now Lumumbastraße). Within a short period, Chaim Eitingon expanded his business with branches in New York and Paris. As early as 1909, Eitingon WM. & Co. was listed in New York in the trade directory of the North American fur industry, "importers and exporters of furs and skins, 45–66 E. Eleventh St."

Eitingon was one of the most successful fur merchants on Leipzig's Brühl. Initially, while still in Moscow, he wanted to specialize in the highest-priced sable skins, but his capital was insufficient for this, so he began with production orders and the distribution of ready-made sable garments. Later, after expanding his assortment, he traded in pelts from almost all relevant countries, except for cheap mass commodities like field hare or rabbit. His connections with the mostly German furriers working for him provided him with contacts to Leipzig's Brühl. During the first ten years after the establishment of the Leipzig branch and his stay in Leipzig, he brought in two nephews as partners: the experienced Max Eitingon (1874–1939), who was intended to be the branch manager, and the then very young Matwey Isakovich (1883–1956), who later emigrated to New York.

In 1925, he converted his company into a joint-stock company (Aktiengesellschaft), whose directors included his nephew Max Eitingon and Chaim's son Waldemar. In 1926 and 1928, his AG reported an annual turnover of 25 million Reichsmark. He invested part of the profits in the real estate business. His leading position in the fur industry earned him the nickname "Fur King" (Pelzkönig) of the Brühl. The family was also called "the Rothschilds of Leipzig."

In 1927, the fur dressing and dyeing company Kurt Wachtel had an annual rabbit skin processing volume of 7 million skins, which meant nearly 20,000 pieces per day. Due to this development, the company was expanded into a "most modernly organized large-scale enterprise" in Taucha, and Kurt Wachtel A.G. was established, whose share capital of 1 million marks was entirely owned by Ch. Eitingon A.G. Kurt Wachtel, the former owner of the fur dye works, joined the management board.

He never completely gave up his connections to the Russian fur market. Soon, he maintained a representative office in Moscow again, the Moscow Joint-Stock Company for Fur Trade (renamed several times). Of all the large firms, he was the most actively engaged in the Western market as a mediator to Russian trading hubs. Around 1920, he founded the Moscow Fur Trading Co. in London and the Société Anonyme de Moscou in Paris. From Moscow, he had already established Eitingon & Co. in New York, with his nephew Matwey serving as its representative. He was unable to sustain this company in its original form and converted it into Eitingon Schild Inc. Between the two World Wars, this company rose to become one of the best-known fur enterprises in the world; under the heirs, it transitioned into the firm Eitingon, Gregory & Jaglou.

In 1921, on the occasion of his 25th business anniversary, Eitingon increased an already established endowment by 7,000 marks to 10,000 marks, with the stipulation that the "proceeds be used for the benefit of merchants' widows and daughters, without regard to status or denomination." The foundation was dissolved by the National Socialists in 1937 in favor of the "Foundation for Special Assistance."

In 1922, he endowed the Orthodox Jewish Ez Chaim Synagogue on Otto-Schill-Straße 6–8. It was Leipzig's second-largest Jewish house of worship which accommodated 1,300 worshippers. Through his son Max, he was also a patron of the psychoanalytic movement; an authenticated witticism by Sigmund Freud reads: "The best cases (Fälle) of analysis are the pelts (Felle) of old Eitingon." The Ez Chaim Synagogue was destroyed in 1938 during the November pogroms, and the Israelite Community was billed for the removal of the rubble.

Together with his nephew Matwei Issakovich, Eitingon founded the Israelite Hospital Eitingon Foundation, which operated the Eitingon Hospital in the Waldstraßenviertel from 1928. Its equipment met the most modern medical standards of its time. This first Jewish hospital, with 79 beds, was open to all denominations until 1938. In 1928, an adjacent street to this hospital was renamed Eitingonstraße in honor of the founder. On the orders of the Gauleiter of Saxony, Martin Mutschmann, the hospital and all its inventory were expropriated on 14 December 1939 and forcibly evacuated within four hours. Patients and medical staff had to move into a single building in the Dösen hospital complex, where they had to get by without diagnostic or therapeutic equipment.

From 1929, Chaim Eitingon was an honorary member of the Israelite Community in Leipzig.

At the age of 75, Chaim Eitingon died on 24 December 1932. He was buried two days later at the New Jewish Cemetery on Delitzscher Straße. His company, Chaim Eitingon AG, was dissolved after his death. According to another source, the liquidation did not take place until 1935, following the seizure of power by the National Socialists and their persecution of Jews.

Since 1992, the former Jewish hospital has once again borne the name Eitingon Hospital (Eitingonstraße 12) and is under the administration of the St. Georg Municipal Hospital.

== Literature ==
- Mary-Kay Wilmers: The Eitingons. A Twentieth Century Story. Faber & Faber, London 2009.
- Zur Geschichte der Juden in Leipzig. Edition Leipzig, Leipzig 1994.
- Bürgerverein Waldstraßenviertel e. V.: Familie Eitingon und die Eitingon-Stiftung. Bonn, Leipzig 2006.
- Steffen Held: "24. Dezember 1932. Chaim Eitingon – Rauchwarenhändler und Stifter." In: Leipziger historischer Kalender 2007. Lehmstedt Verlag, Leipzig 2006.
- Nora Pester: "Chaim Eitingon." In: Jüdisches Leipzig. Menschen – Orte – Geschichte. Hentrich & Hentrich, Berlin et al. 2023, ISBN 978-3-95565-562-4, pp. 60–61.
- Horst Riedel: Stadtlexikon Leipzig von A bis Z. 1st edition. ProLEIPZIG, Leipzig 2005.
- Stadtarchiv Leipzig (ed.): LEXIKON Leipziger Straßennamen. Verlag im Wissenschaftszentrum, Leipzig 1995.
