= Joshua Zeitlin =

Russian rabbinical scholar and philanthropist

Joshua Zeitlin (1742 in Shklov, Belarus – August 18, 1822, in Kherson, Novorossiya) was a Russian rabbinical scholar and philanthropist. He was a pupil of the Talmudist Rabbi Aryeh Leib ben Asher Gunzberg, who was the author of Sha'agat Aryeh. Being an expert in political economics, he maintained close relations with Prince Potemkin, the favorite of Catherine the Great. During the Turko-Russian war, Zeitlin furnished the Russian army with various supplies, and managed that business so well that afterwards, he was appointed as Imperial Court Councillor.

After retiring from business in the civil rank of court councillor, Zeitlin resided on his estate, Ustzia, where he was occasionally consulted by rabbis. He rendered financial assistance to many Talmudists and scholars, and supported a local beit midrash, in which many Jewish scholars were provided for, so that they could pursue their studies full-time. Some of the scholars who benefited from his generosity were: Rabbi Nahum, author of Tosafot Bikkurim; Mendel Lepin, author of Cheshbon ha-Nefesh; and the physician Baruch Schick. Zeitlin was the author of annotations to the Sefer Mitzwot Katan, that were printed with the text (Kopys, 1820), and supplemented by some of his responsa.
