= Shklov =

Town in Mogilev Region, Belarus

Shklov Шклоў (Belarusian) Шклов (Russian)
- Town
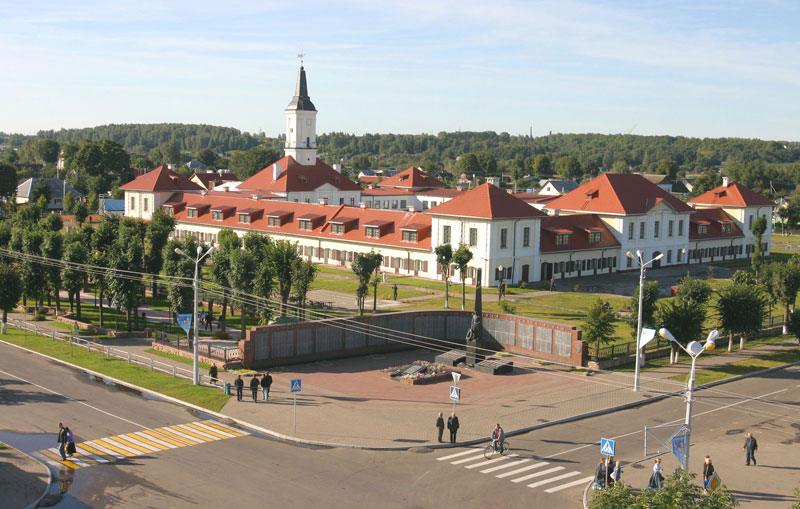

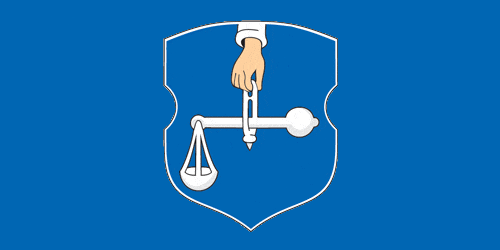
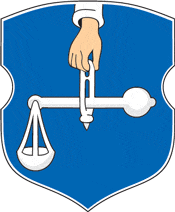
- Flag Coat of arms

- Location within Belarus
- Coordinates: 54°13′25″N 30°17′11″E
- Country: Belarus
- Region: Mogilev region
- District: Shklov district

Population (2025)
  - Total: 14,738
- Time zone: UTC+3 (MSK)
- License plate: 6

Shklov or Shklow (Note: Belarusian: Шклоў, romanized: Škloŭ, IPA: [ʂkɫɔu̯]; Russian: Шклов, romanized: Shklov; Yiddish: שקלאָוו, romanized: Shklov; Lithuanian: Šklovas; Polish: Szkłów.) is a town in Mogilev region, Belarus, located 35 kilometres (22 mi) north of Mogilev on the Dnieper River. It serves as the administrative center of Shklov district. It has a railway station on the line between Orsha and Mogilev. In 2009, its population was 16,439. As of 2025, it has a population of 14,738.

== History ==
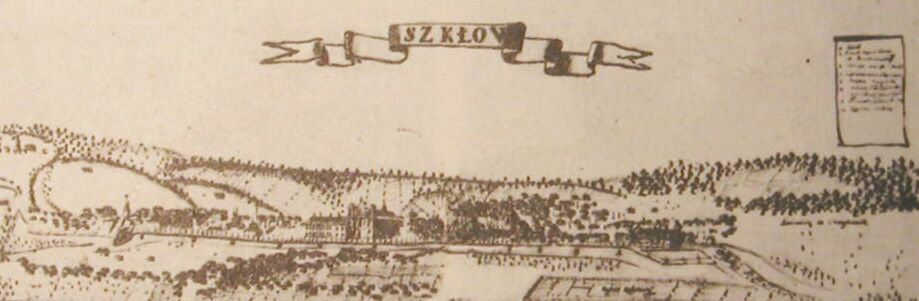
An 18th-century drawing of Shklov (Polish: Szkłów)

=== Jewish history ===
Shklov was an important Jewish religious center. There was a yeshiva there in the 18th century. Shklov became the center of the Haskalah movement. At the end of the 19th century, there were 5542 Jews in the town. During the Soviet times a dozen families worked in the Jewish kolkhoz Iskra. In 1939, only 2132 Jews remained in Shklov.

The Germans occupied the town on July 12, 1941. The first execution of Jews took place just a few days into the occupation. The Germans shot 25 Jewish men in Lenin Park. At the end of July 1941, two ghettos were established in the neighboring village of Ryzhkovichi (now incorporated in Shklov). In August 1941, the Einsatzgruppen arrived in the town and gathered 84 Jews under the pretext of sending them to forced labor. In fact, they were taken to the village of Semyonovka and shot. In September 1941, the Jews were taken to a ravine in Khoduly, between the villages of Putniki and Zarechye. They had to undress and lie in the ditch before being shot. According to Soviet sources, 3,200 Jews were killed in Shklov and in the areas around.

== Transport ==
- 1 railway station
- 3 bus routes

== Notable people ==
The Jewish family name Shklovsky or Shklover indicates that the person or their ancestors come from Shkloŭ.

- Semyon Zorich, Serbian-born Russian General who founded an estate in Shkloŭ (Shklov).
- Yitzhak Salkinsohn, born in Shklov
- Joshua Zeitlin, rabbinical scholar and philanthropist, born here
- Yehoshua Leib Diskin, rabbi in Shklov
- Rogatchover Gaon, studied in Shklov under Yehoshua Leib
- Pavel Axelrod (1850–1928), Russian Menshevik revolutionary
- Zalman Shneur (1887–1959), Hebrew and Yiddish poet
- Baruch Schick of Shklov (1744–1808) rabbi and scholar, Hebrew author and translator
- Josef Gusikov, klezmer musician, born in Shklov
- Naum Eitingon, general of the NKVD and murderer of Leon Trotsky, born in Shklov
- Yisroel ben Shmuel of Shklov, rabbi, disciple of the Vilna Gaon
- Moshe Feinstein, rabbi, studied and lived in Shklov before emigrating to the United States to become the preeminent Torah sage and posek of his generation
- Anatoly Motsny, Red Army senior lieutenant and criminal

== Gallery ==
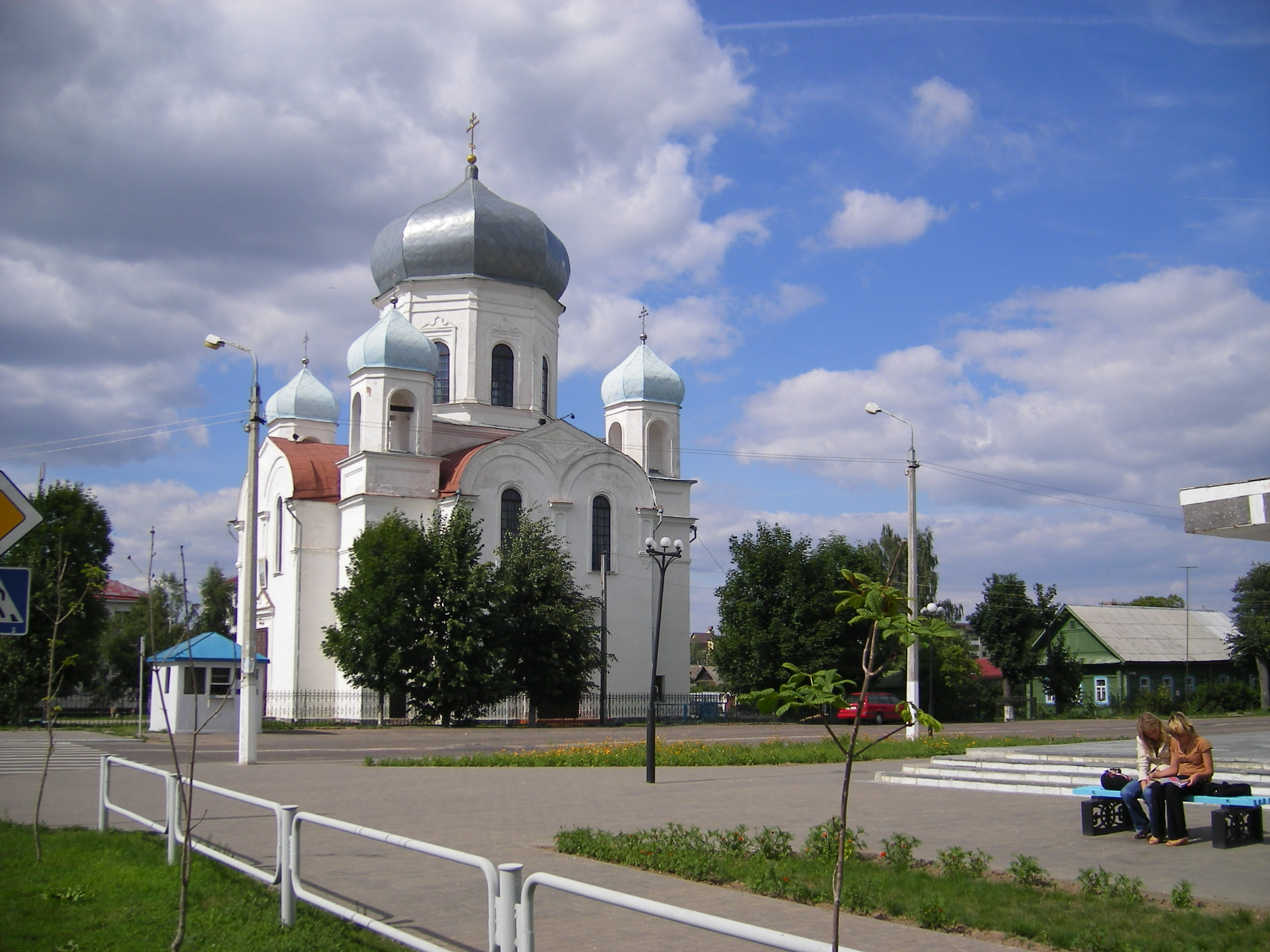
The Transfiguration Church

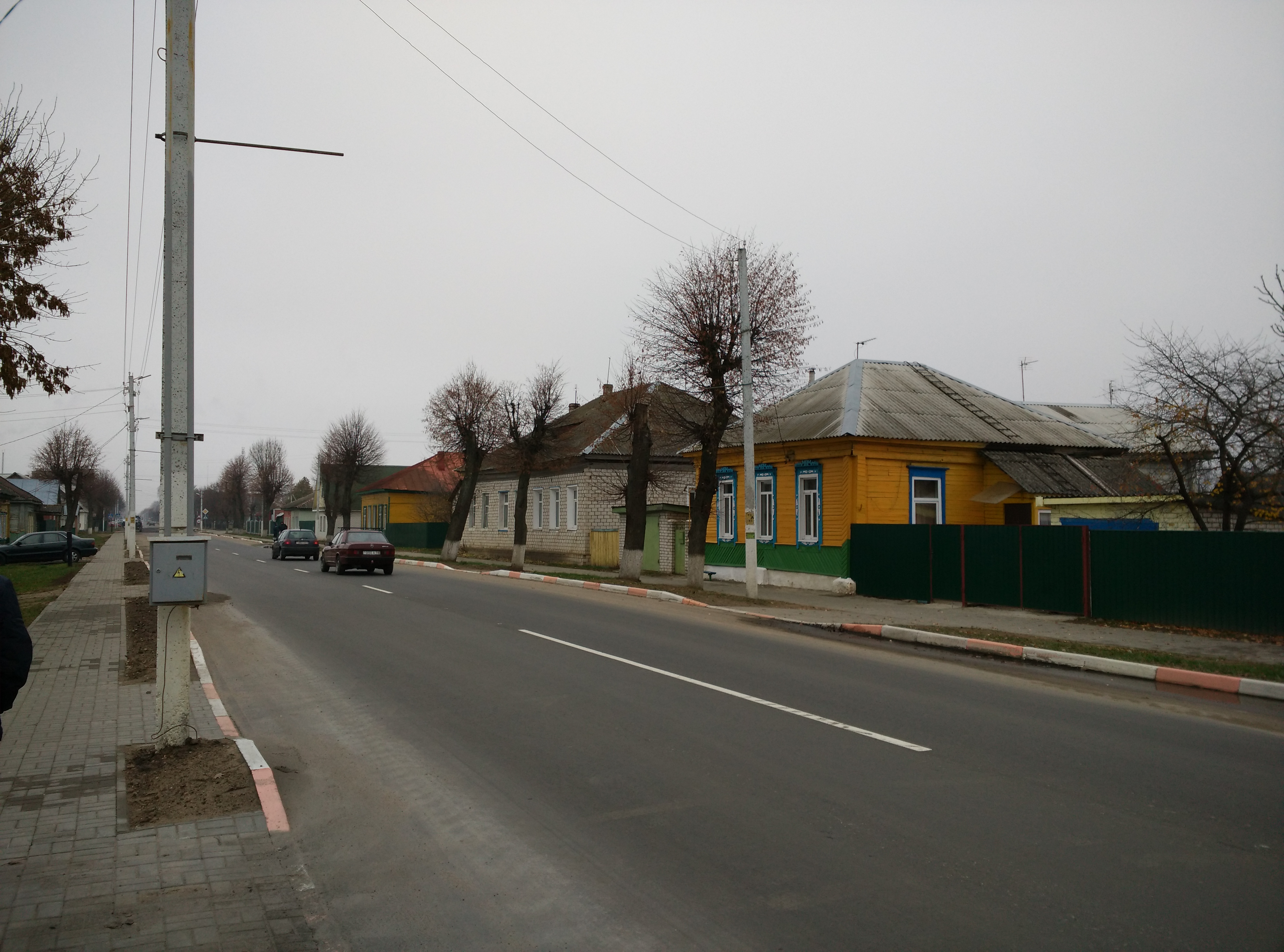
Škloŭ, Prabojnaja vulica

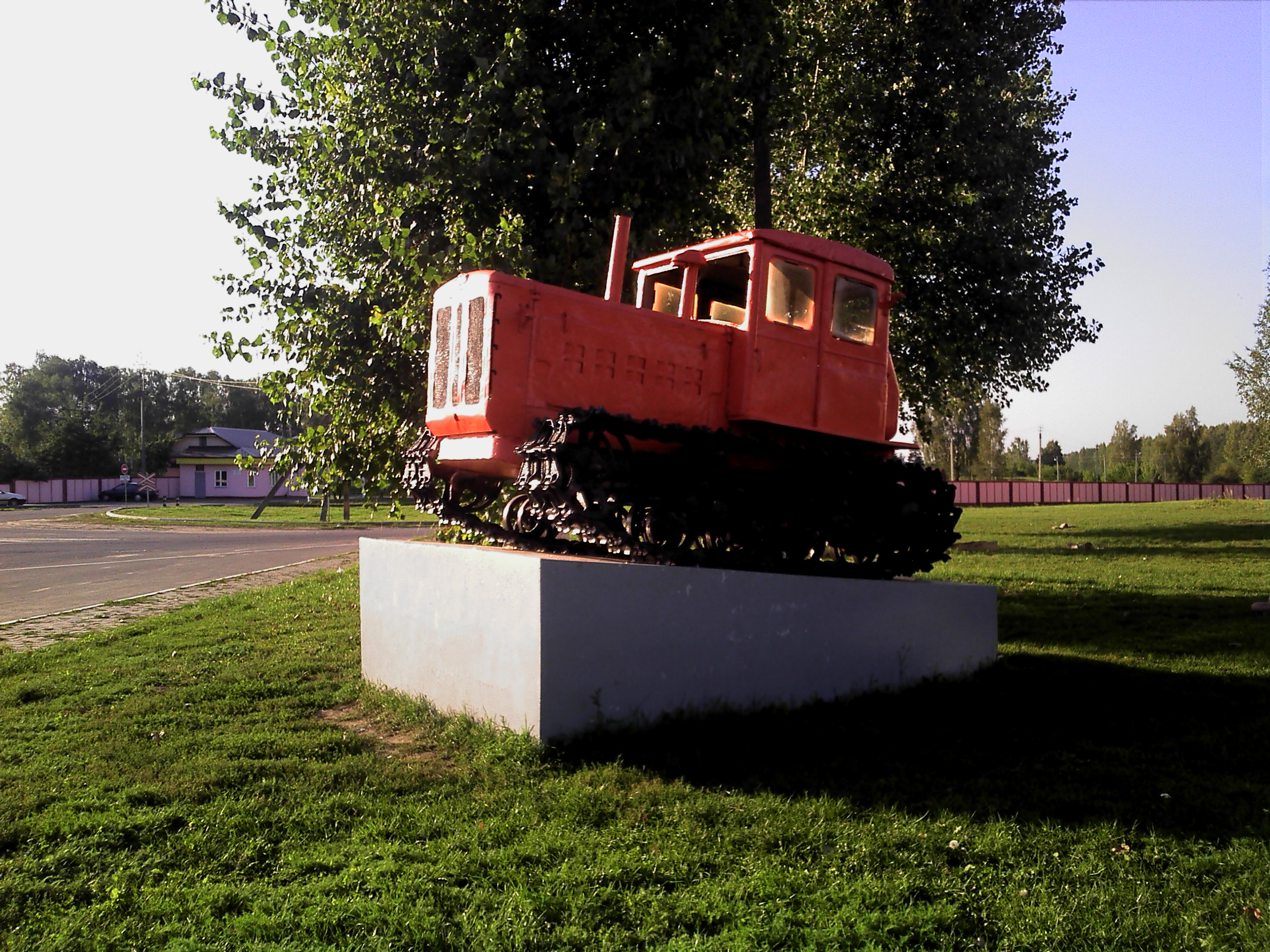
Monument of tractor

== See also ==
- Battle of Holowczyn
