= Jewish Cemeteries in Leipzig, Germany =

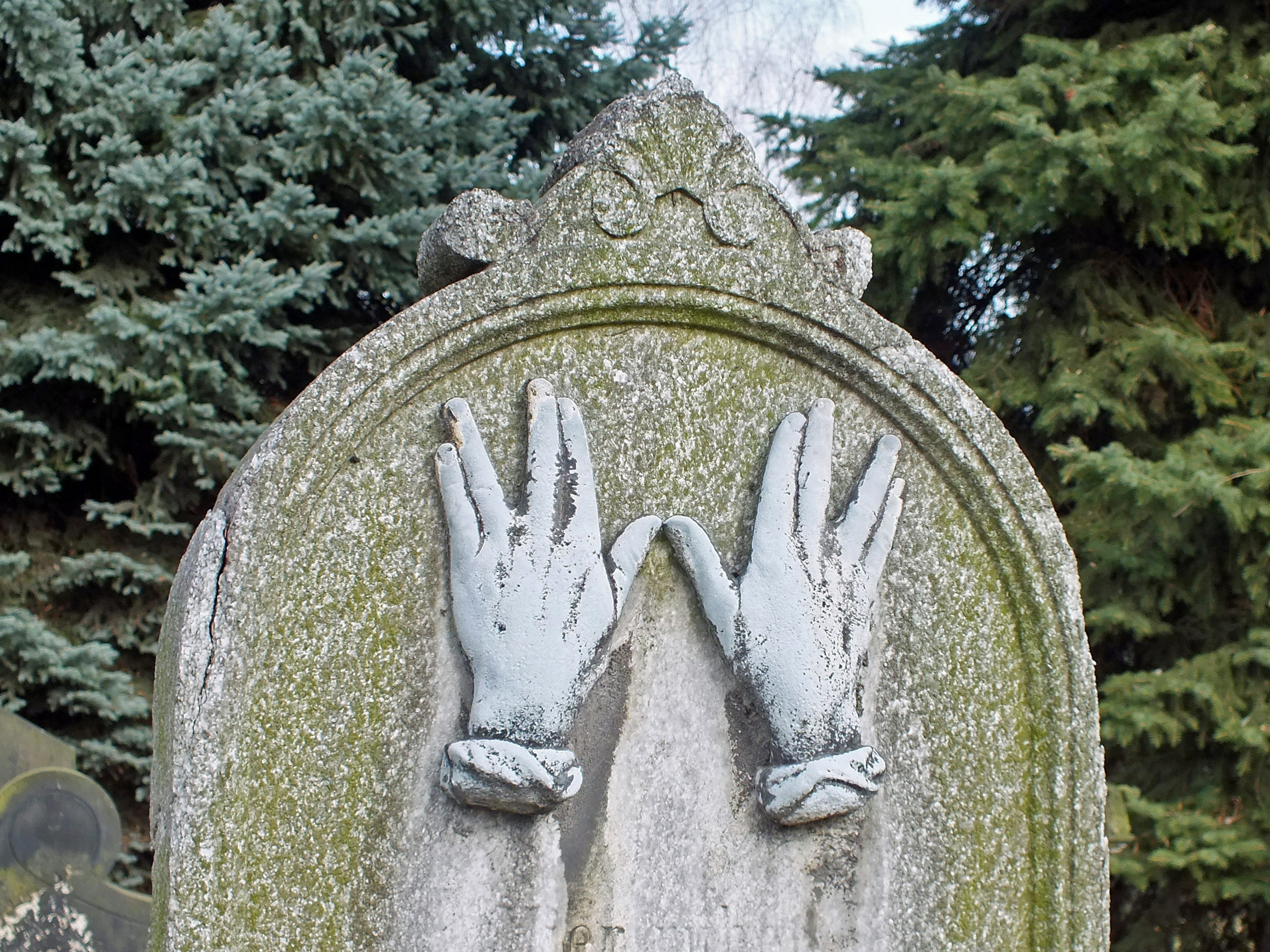
Hands of the Kohen – a symbol of blessing on some graves of the Old Israelite Cemetery

There were three and now there are two Jewish cemeteries in Leipzig. The first Jewish cemetery of the city, in the Johannistal, no longer exists. The Old Israelite Cemetery on Berliner Straße was used from 1864 to 1928. Burials still take place today at the New Israelite Cemetery on Delitzscher Straße, which opened afterwards.

== Background ==
In the late 15th century, the Jews of Leipzig were stripped of their right of residence. Only from 1710 onward were there occasional settlements. An exception was made during the times of the trade fair, when Jewish traders were in some cases even welcome. If one of them died during this period, burial in Leipzig was not possible. It was necessary to transport the body to home towns not too far away, or to the Jewish cemeteries in Naumburg or Dessau, in each case for a fee. From 1798 onward, Jewish merchants—particularly those from Brody—sought a burial site in Leipzig. Their efforts were not crowned with success until 1814.

== The first Jewish cemetery ==
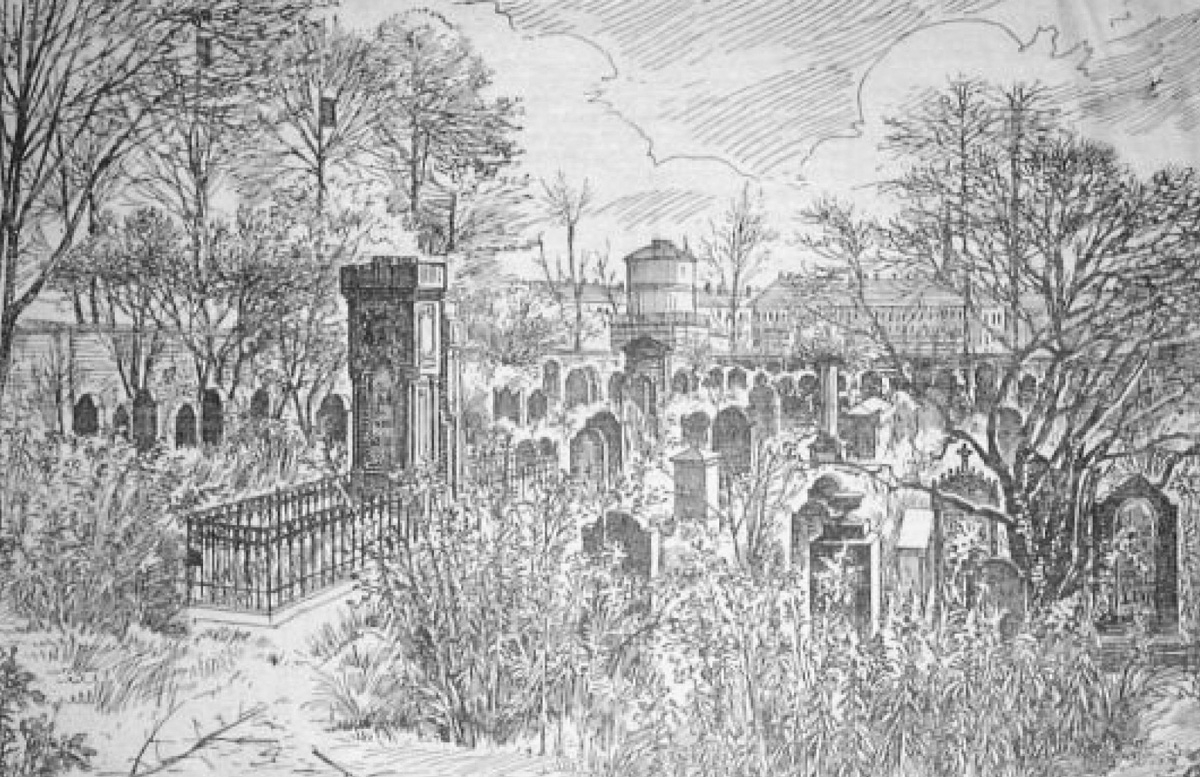
The first Jewish cemetery in the Johannistal

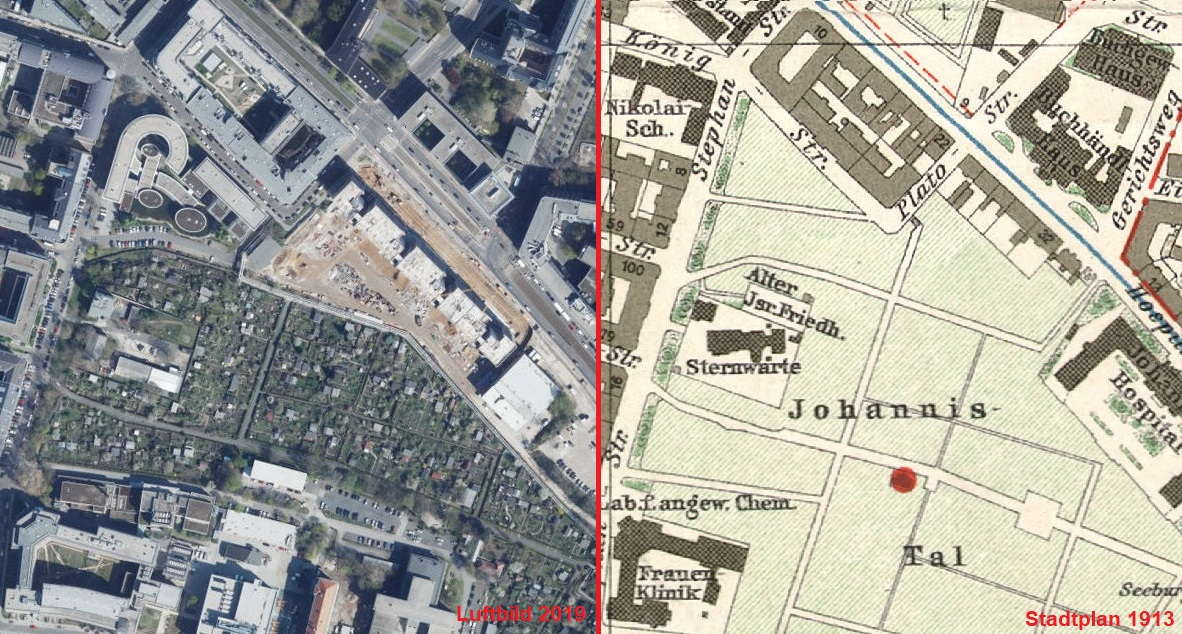
Location of the first Jewish cemetery

For 200 Thalers and an annual concession fee of 20 thalers, the Brody merchants received permission from the Leipzig council to establish a burial site in the Johannistal at location with coordinates 51.333792°N 12.389192°E. The grounds were located next to the municipal black powder depot, on which the new Leipzig Observatory was built in 1861. From 1832 the cemetery was surrounded by allotment gardens.

The first burial took place on 28 November 1814. Within the following 50 years, 334 people were buried there. The closely spaced gravestones presented the typical appearance of a Jewish cemetery. The shortage of space for graves, together with the Saxon regulation requiring a mortuary on every cemetery—which was no longer possible here, led to the cemetery's closure in 1864, although it initially remained intact as such.

In 1937 the Jewish community received notice of the cemetery's termination from the National Socialist Leipzig city administration. The dead were exhumed and the remains buried in individual containers in a mass grave at the New Israelite Cemetery. Only a few prominent figures received individual graves. The gravestones, apart from a few that were likewise moved to the New Israelite Cemetery, were broken into small pieces and reused in burials. The cemetery grounds were absorbed into the surrounding allotment garden complex.

== The Old Israelite Cemetery ==
In 1862 the Jewish community had acquired a strip of land adjoining Berliner Straße from a private owner at 51.36119°N 12.395431°E. The work began in 1863 on laying out a burial site. In addition to the mortuary, it included ritually necessary rooms and the residence of the cemetery administrator. The 400-metre-long grounds extend from Berliner Straße to the later Theresienstraße and are less than 50 metres wide. To the west they are bordered by the later buildings on Hamburger Straße and to the east by the Nordfriedhof (North Cemetery), opened in 1876. The site is accessed by a central main path. Of the five sections, the first four are each divided by partition walls. On these and on the side walls are the wall plots of family and hereditary burials, which are rather atypical for Jewish cemeteries and here represent above all the banking houses such as Ariowitsch, Kroch and Breslauer. One wall monument is also that of Rabbi Abraham Meyer Goldschmidt and his wife, the educator and women's rights activist Henriette Goldschmidt. A memorial commemorates the names of 121 Jewish war dead of World War I.

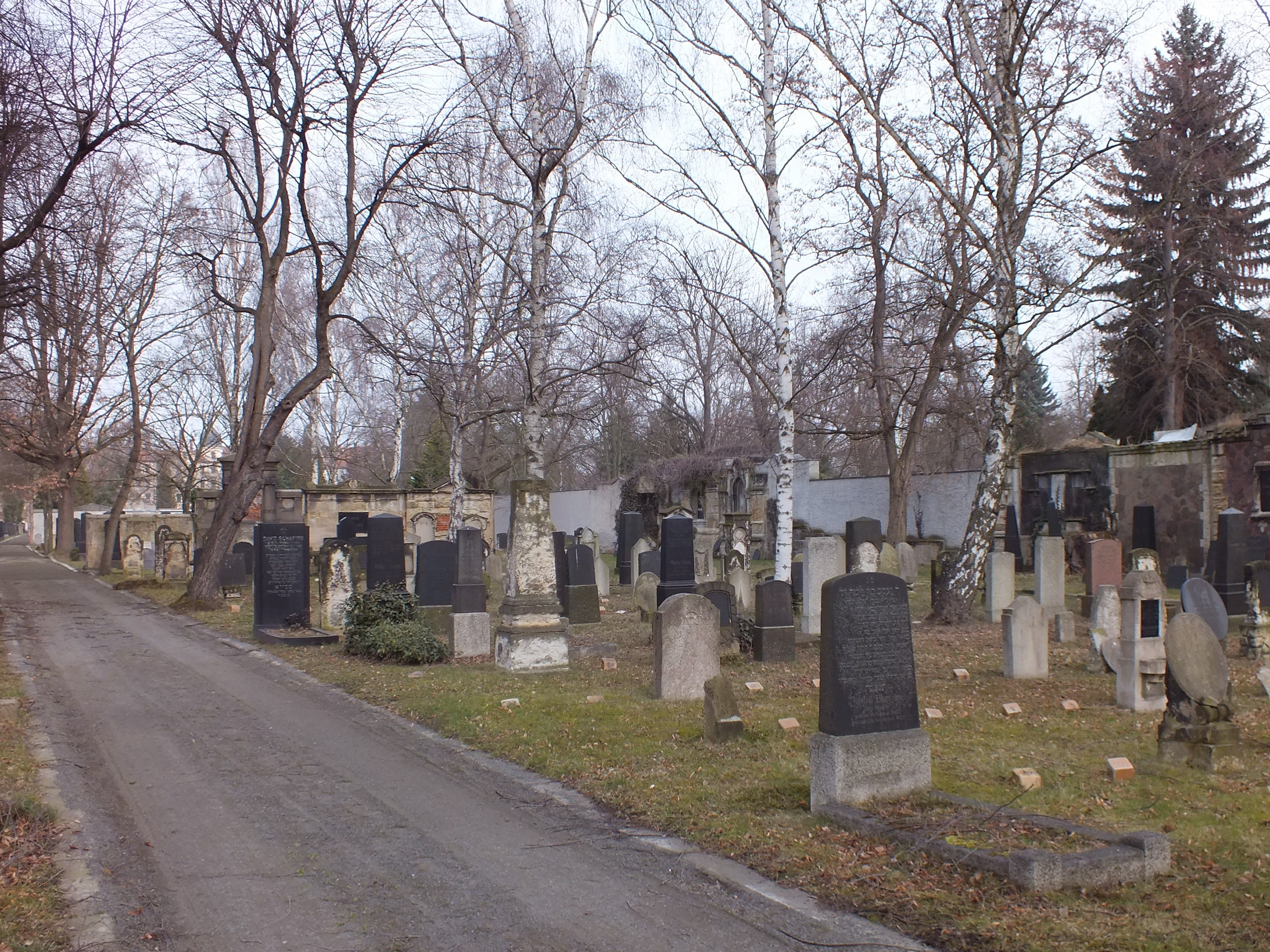
Partial view of the cemetery

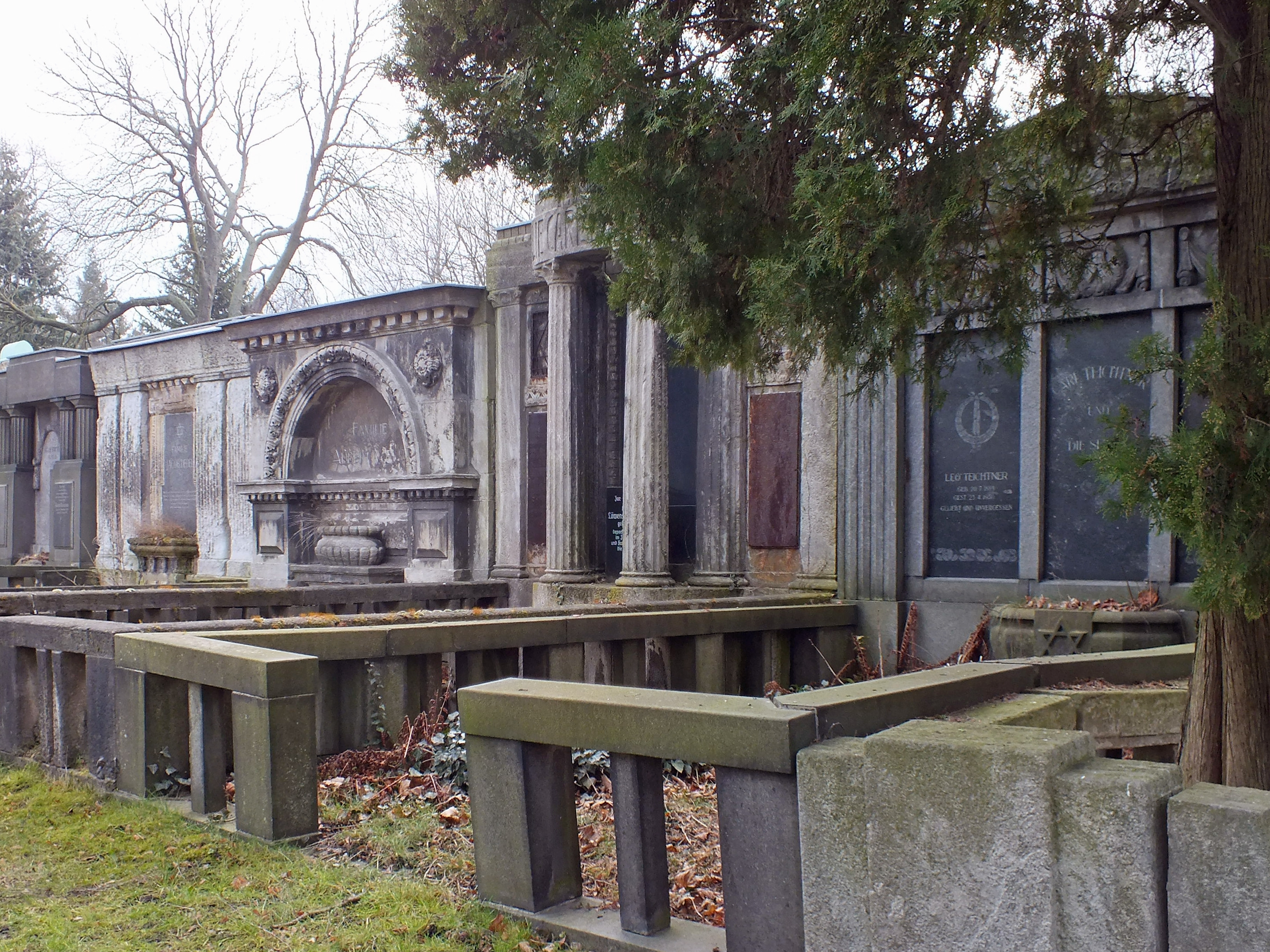
Graves of honour at a partition wall

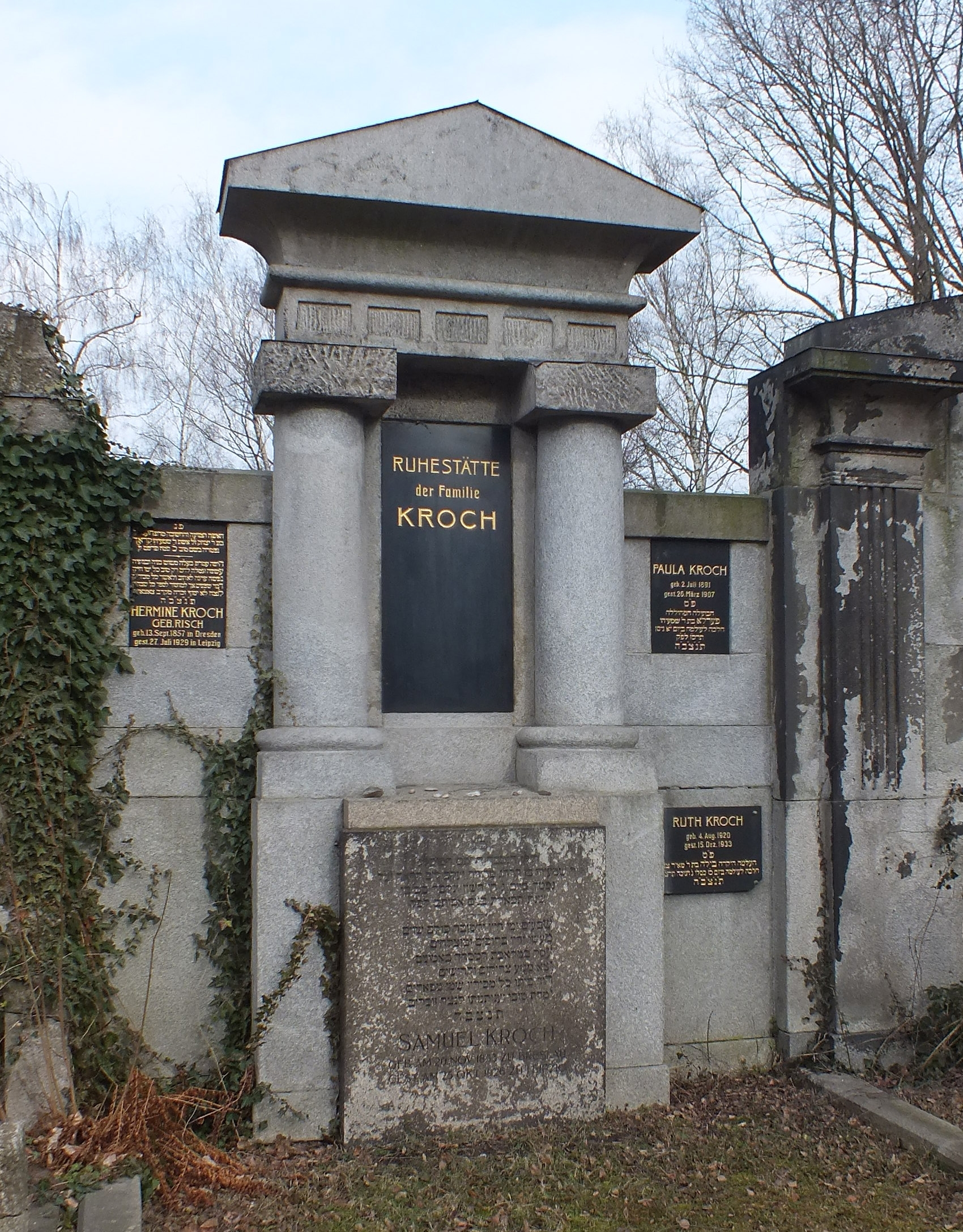
The Kroch family grave

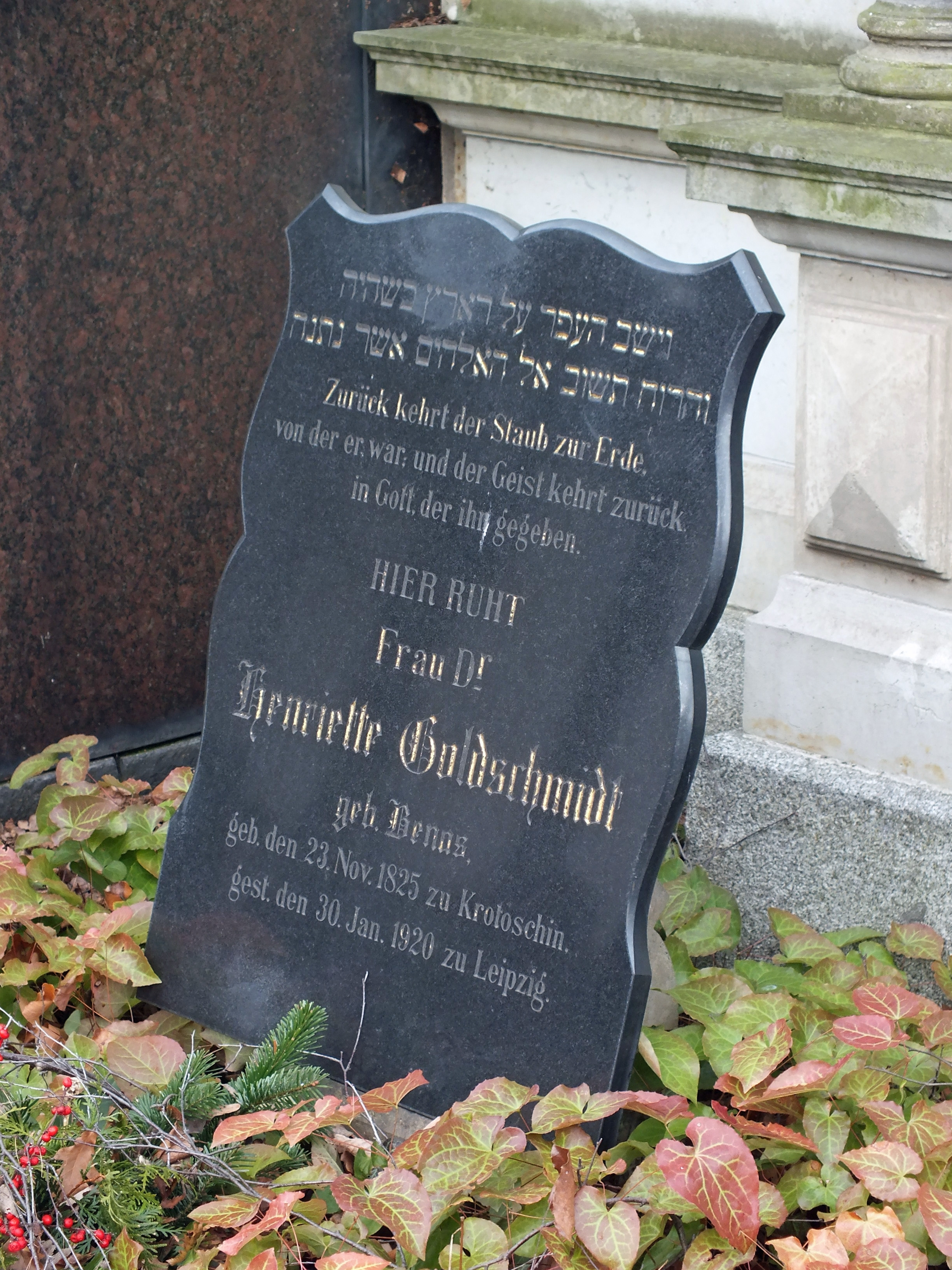
The grave tablet of Henriette Goldschmidt

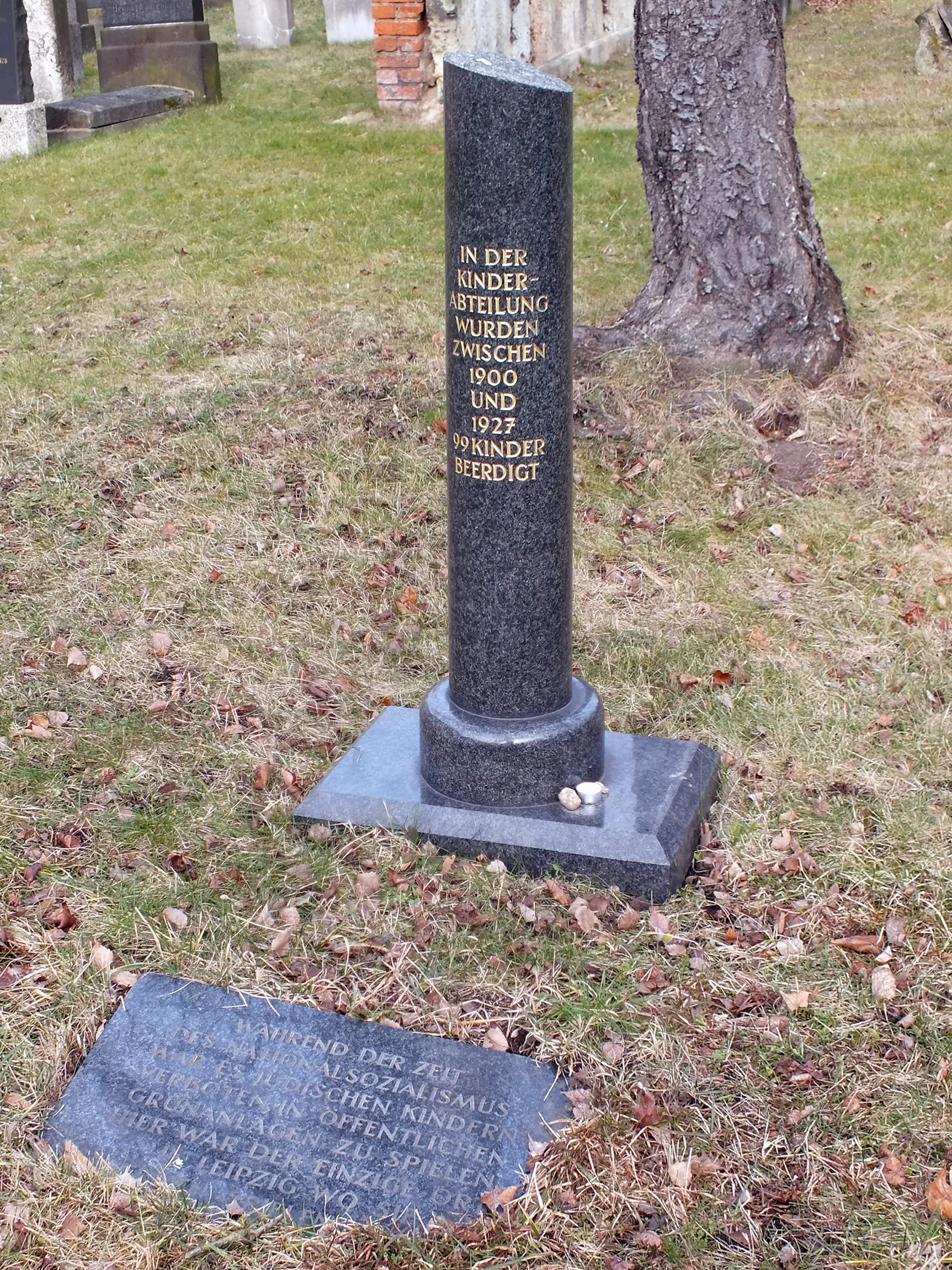
Children's stele and a reference to the playground during the Nazi era

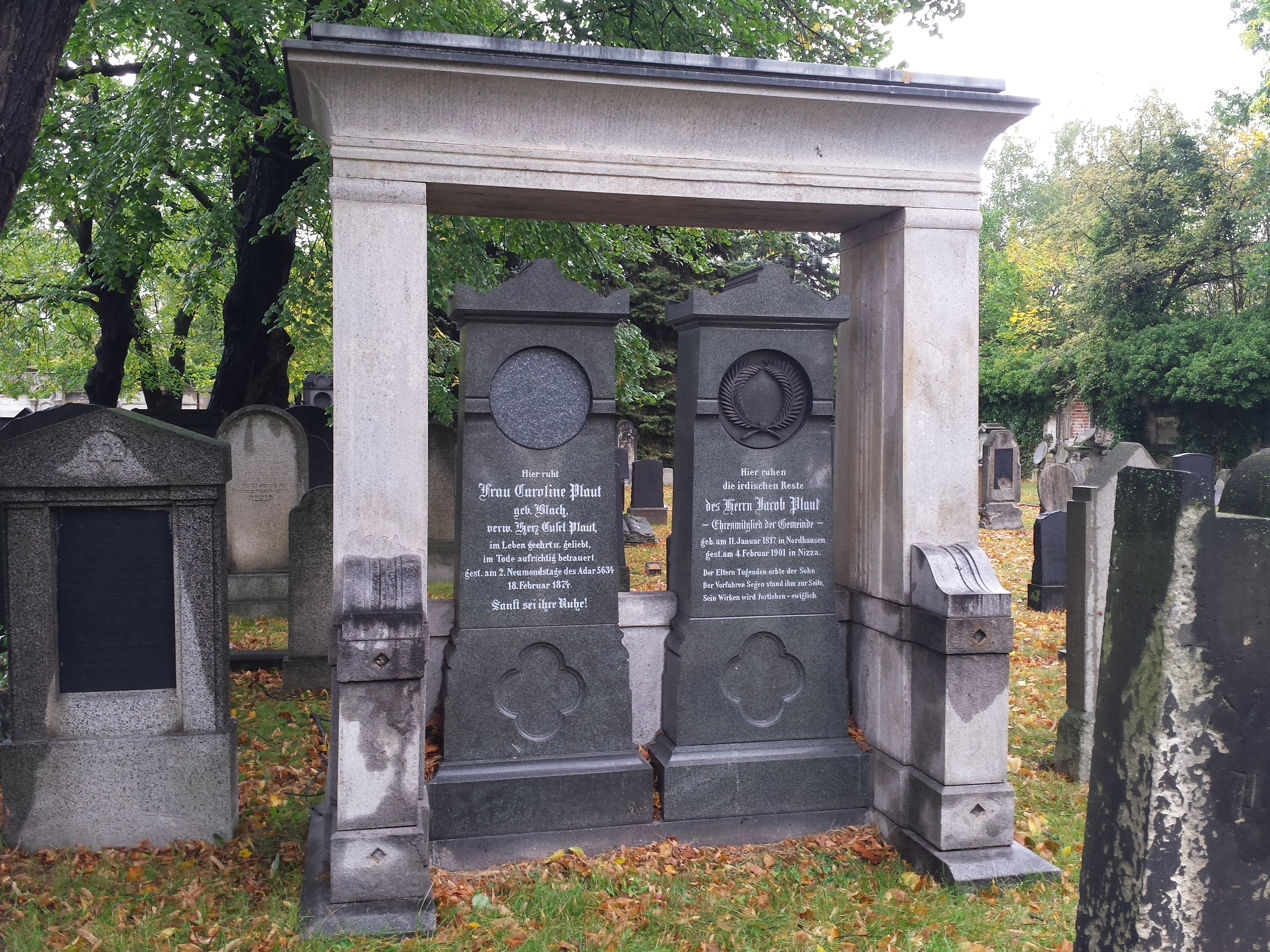
Grave of Jacob Plaut

The cemetery suffered damage through vandalism during the Nazi era and World War II. Small numbered stones in the rows of graves mark lost monuments as well as burial sites that never had a monument, among them concentration camp victims. A floor slab in the children's section indicates that Jewish children played in the cemetery during the Nazi era because they were forbidden to do so in public grounds.

At the end of the 1920s, burials shifted to the New Israelite Cemetery, but resumed once more after that cemetery was devastated in 1938. The cemetery contains more than 5,000 grave sites. The buildings in the entrance area were demolished after being hit by bombs in World War II. The Old Israelite Cemetery is today a protected historic monument and is maintained by the cemetery department of the City of Leipzig's Office for Urban Greenery and Waters.

After completing a multi-year research project, the Ephraim Carlebach Foundation succeeded in producing a complete digital documentation of all grave sites of the Old Israelite Cemetery.

== The New Israelite Cemetery ==
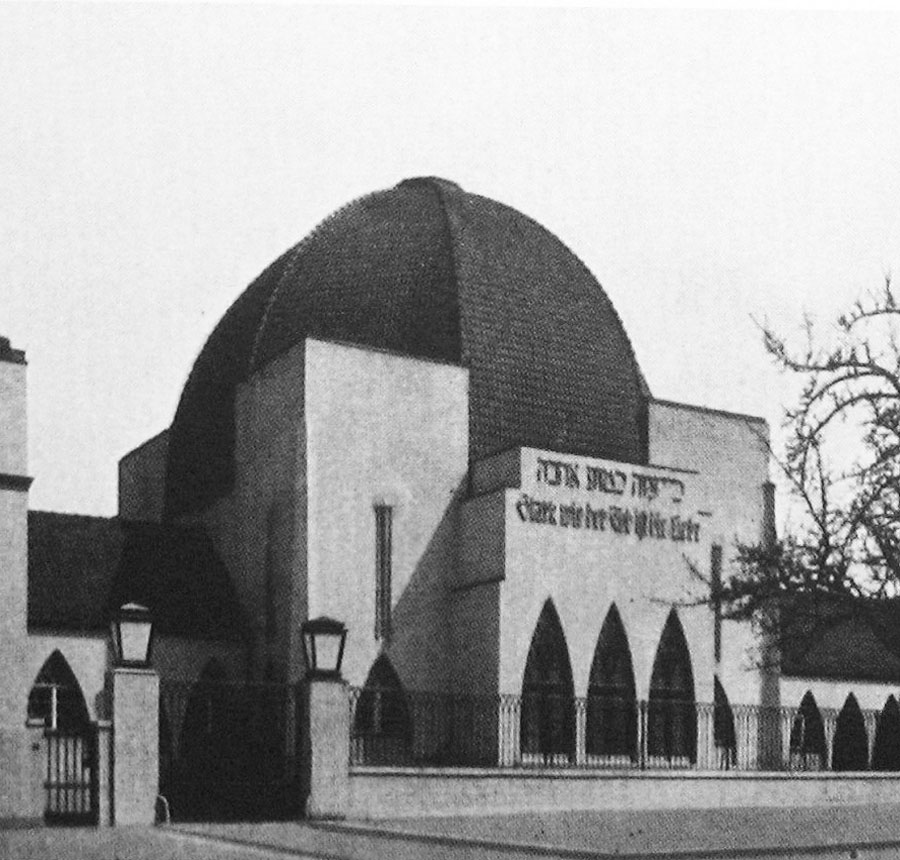
The former funeral hall, destroyed during Nazi rule

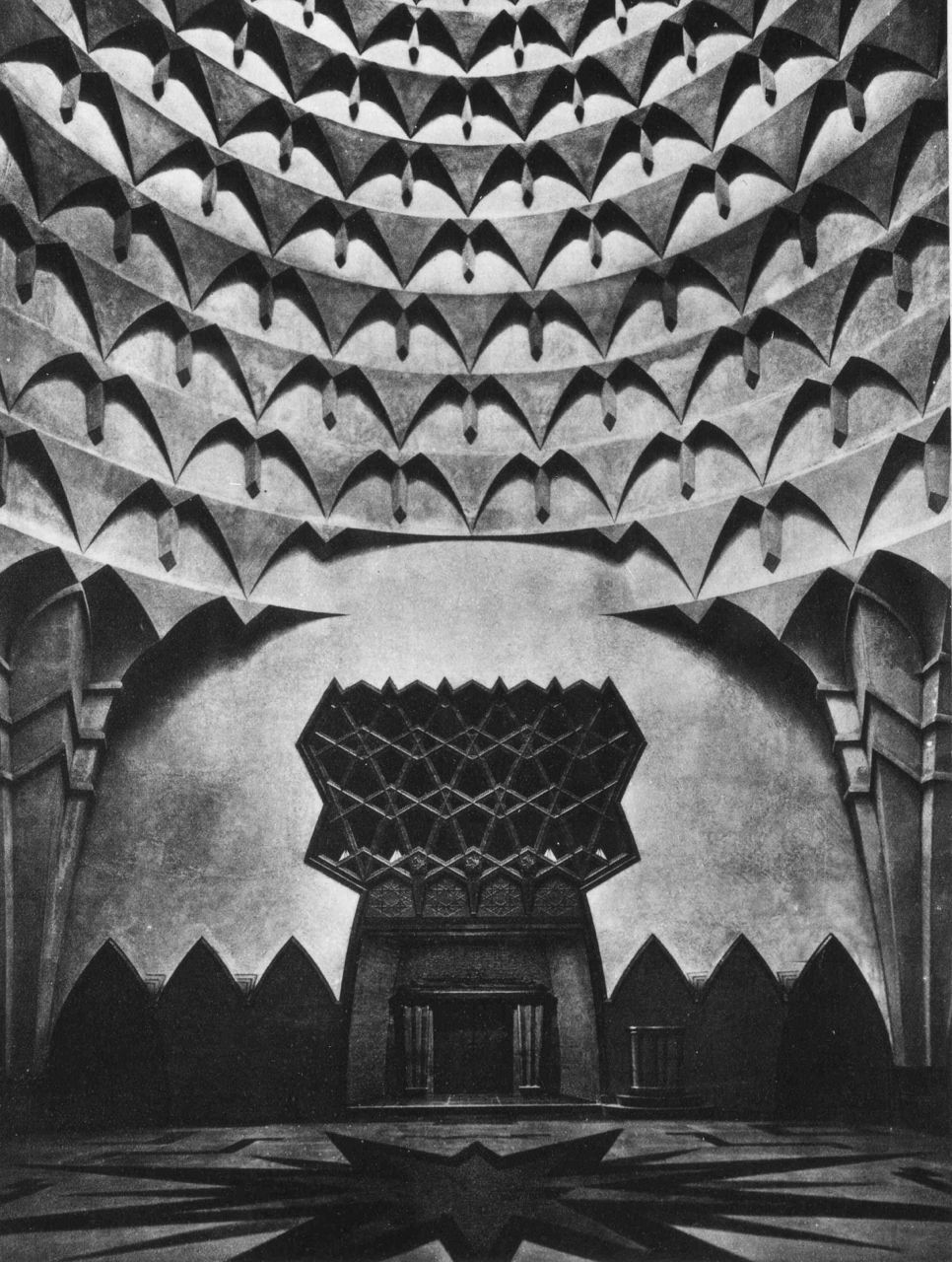
Interior of the funeral hall, looking towards the dome

At the beginning of the 20th century, the Jewish community again sought to lay out a new cemetery, since the full occupation of the old cemetery was foreseeable. On grounds acquired by the Jewish community on Delitzscher Straße at the northern edge of the city, opposite St. Georg Hospital at coordinates 51.386586°N 12.381343°E, planting work to lay out a cemetery began in 1925. At the entrance to the roughly two-hectare site, a funeral hall was built from 1927 till 1928 over an 18-month construction period by plans of the architect Wilhelm Haller. The U-shaped, two-storey structure grouped its functional rooms around a central domed building with a three-arched pillared portico. The domed hall had a floor area of 18 by 18 metres, above which the dome rose in a double shell, externally 21.5 metres high with an octagonal plan, and internally round with stalactite-like concrete pendants. The cemetery was consecrated in May 1928.

Just ten years later, the cemetery building fell victim to an arson attack by the National Socialist Motor Corps on 10 November 1938, the day after Kristallnacht. The domed hall remained almost undamaged. It was blown up in 1939 by order of the NSDAP district leadership. Without the buildings, no more dead could be buried, which is why the old cemetery was used instead.

By 1948 the clearing work on the devastated cemetery was completed, and with the help of two barracks, burials could take place again. In 1951, on the site of the former domed building, a sarcophagus-like memorial was created for the murdered Jews of Leipzig, with the inscription in German and Hebrew: "Hear, all you peoples, and behold my sorrow." When a new funeral hall was built from 1953 to 1955 on part of the former cemetery building, the memorial was moved to the interior of the cemetery.

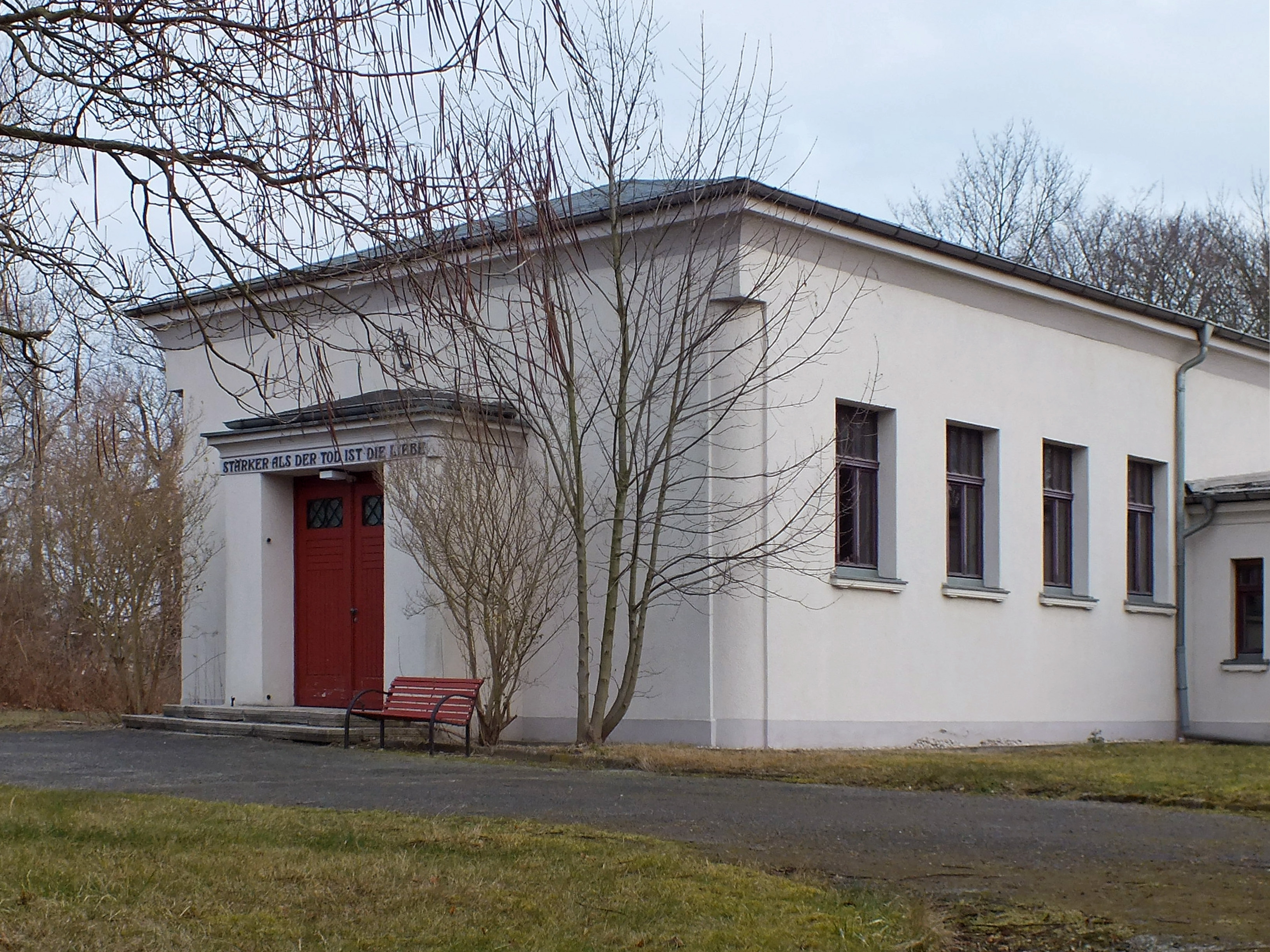
The new funeral hall

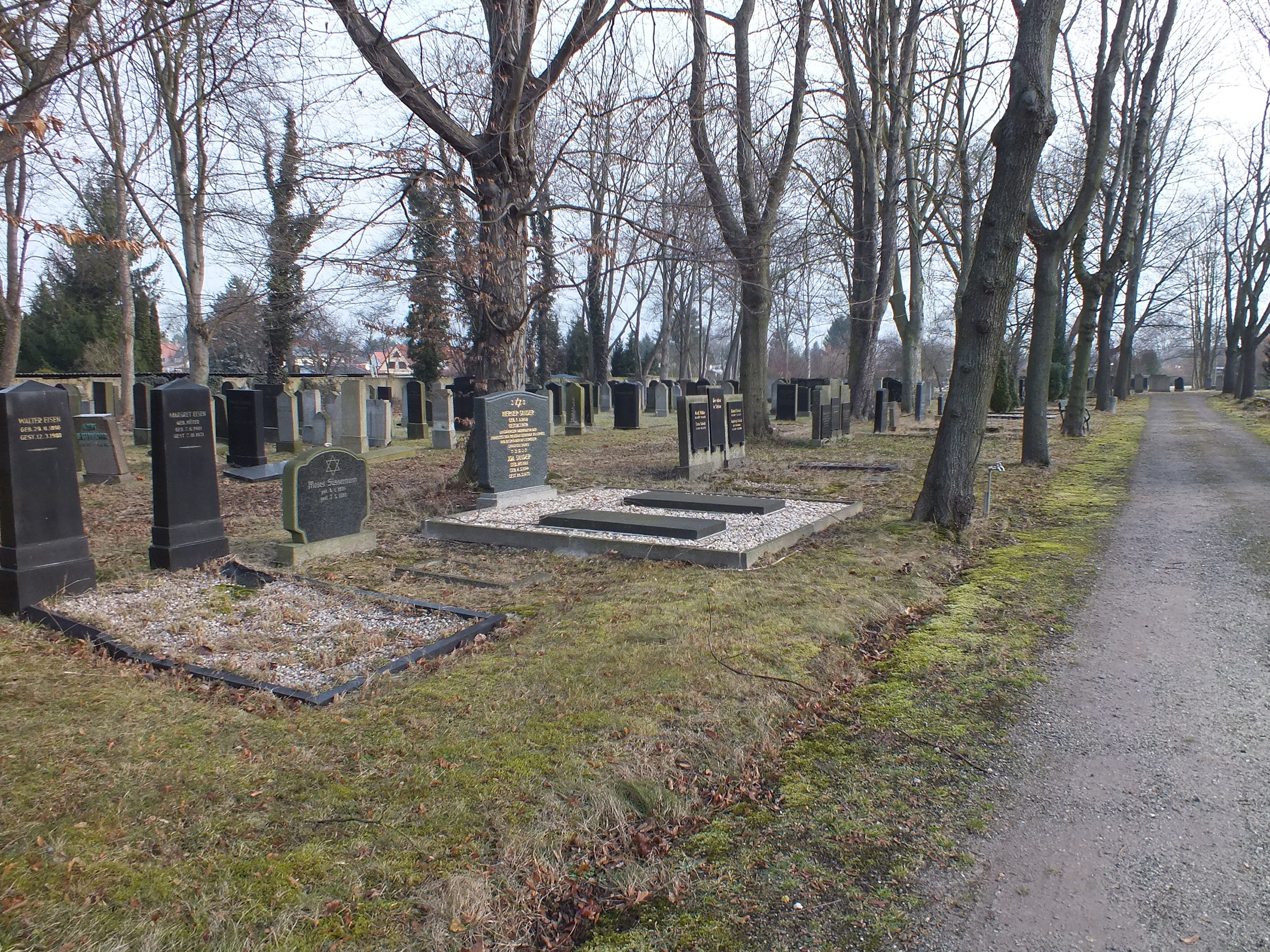
Partial view of the cemetery

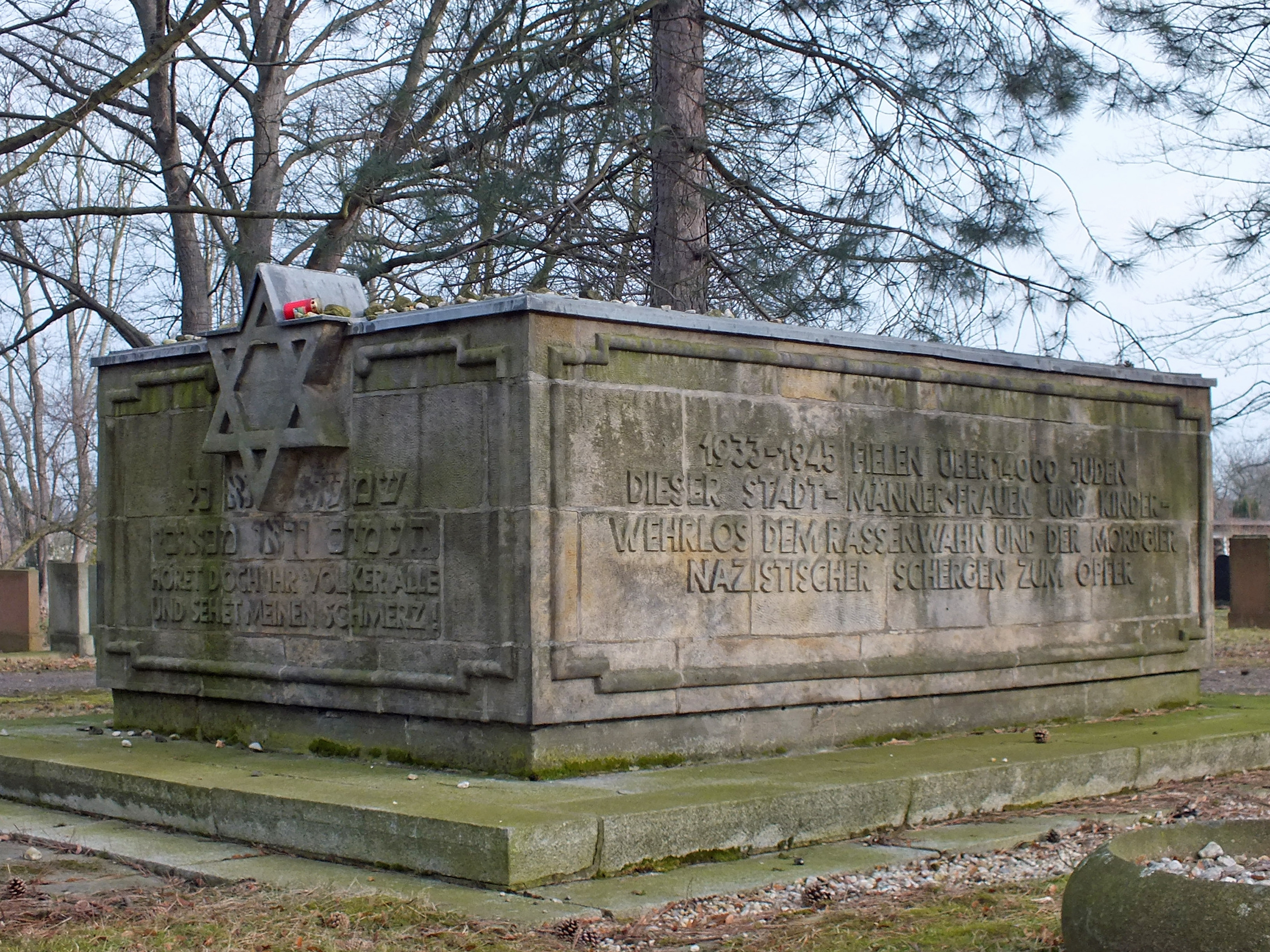
The memorial of 1951

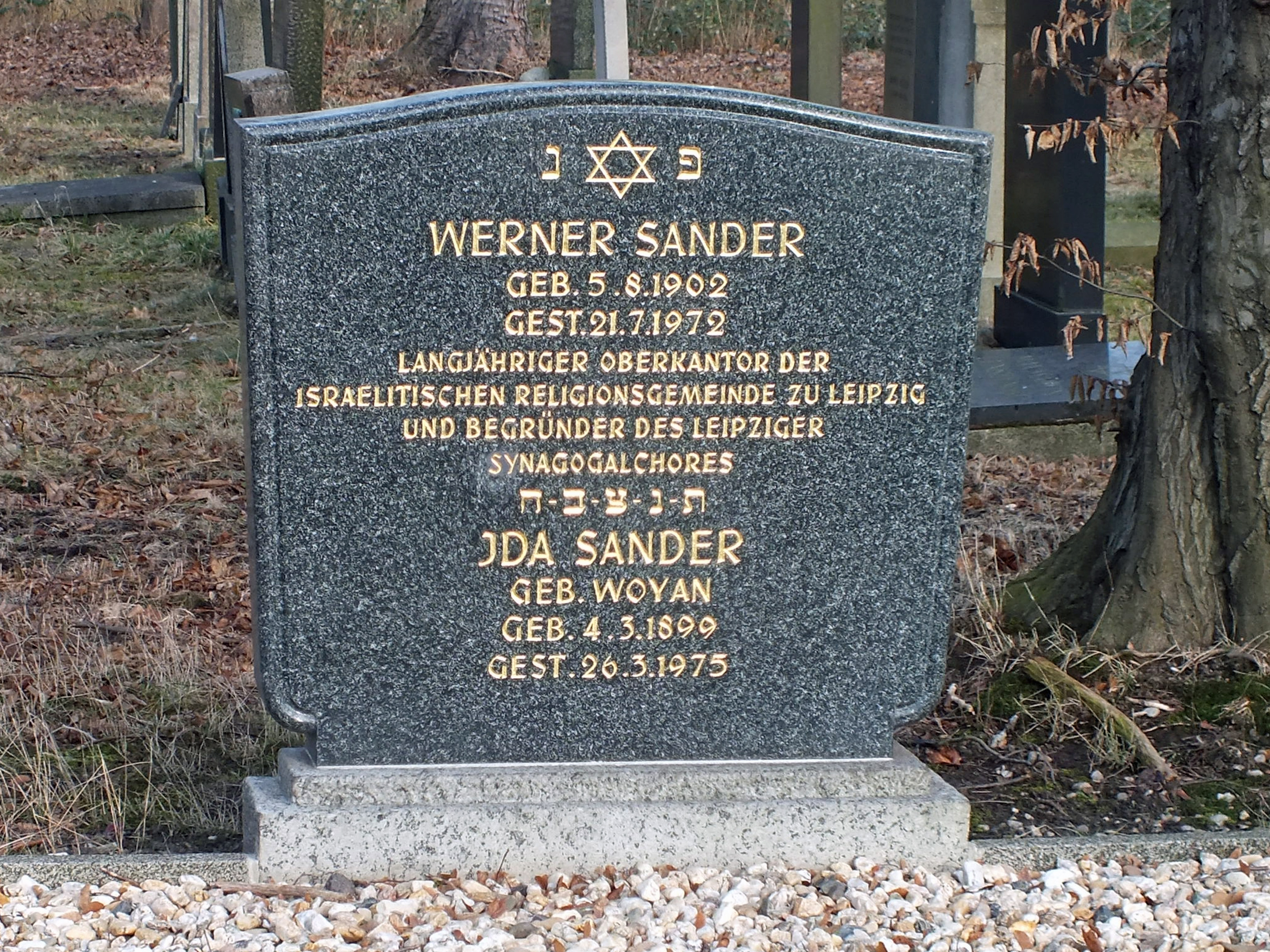
The grave of Werner Sander

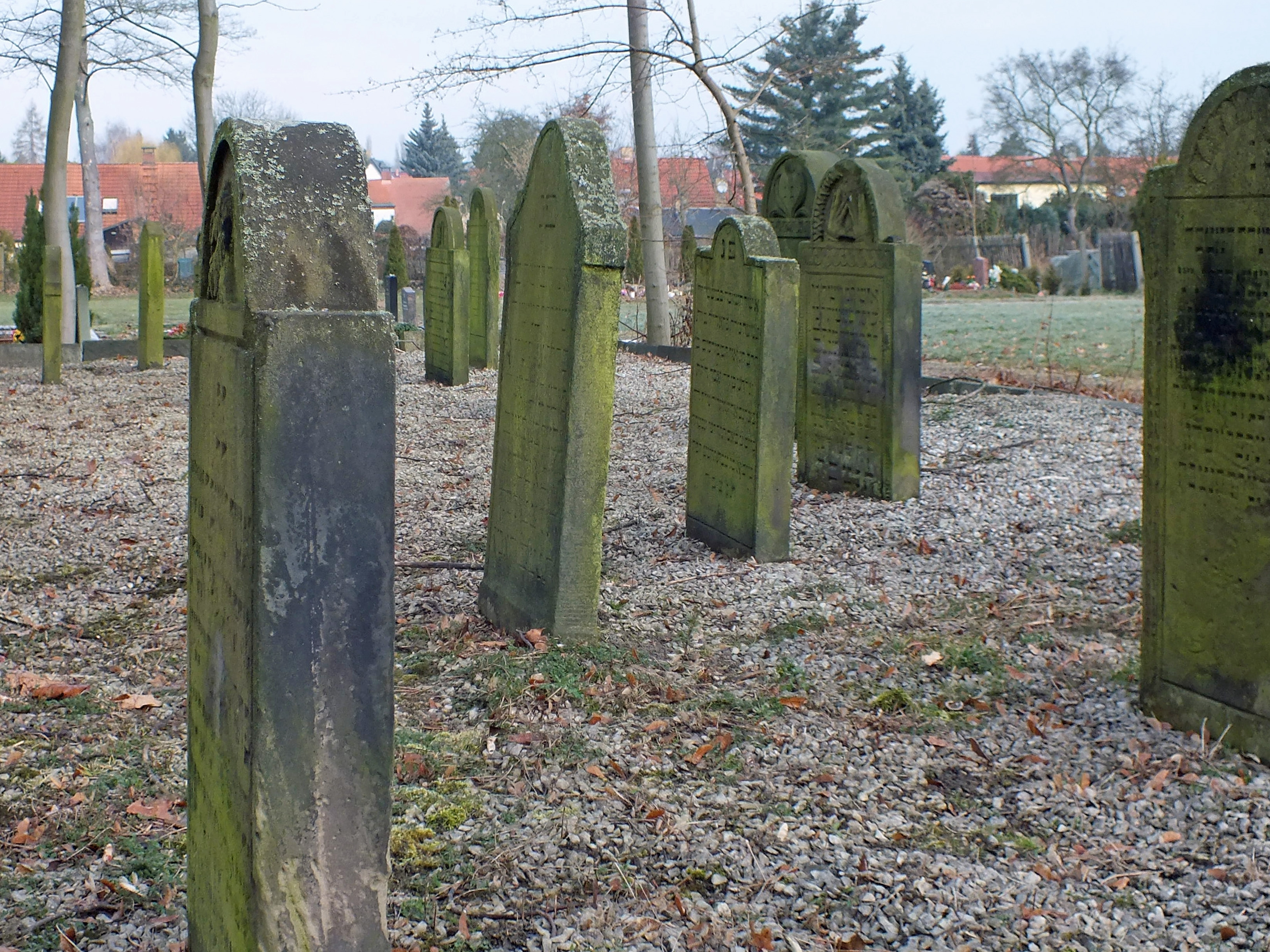
Stones from the first Jewish cemetery

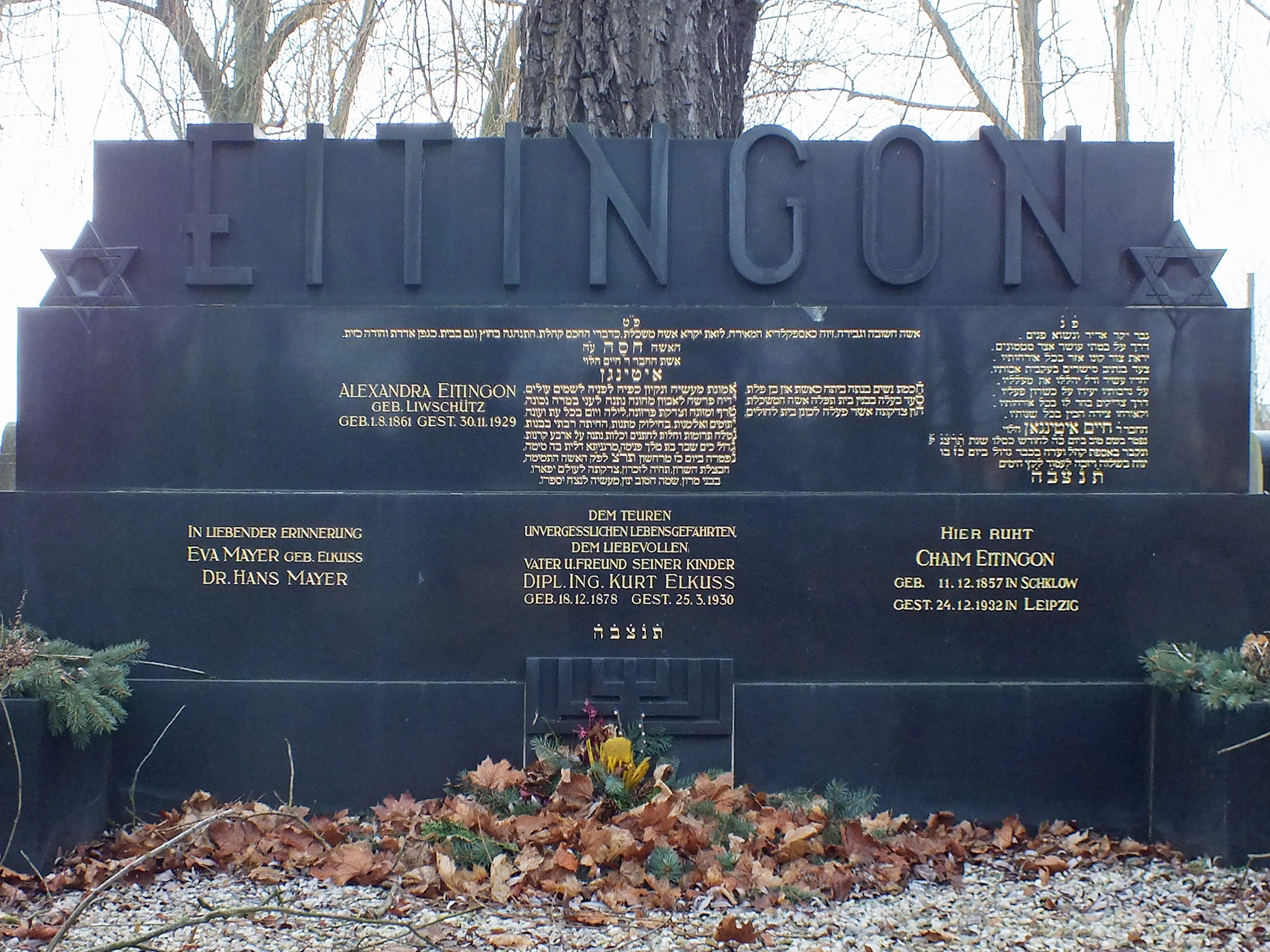
Eitingon family tomb

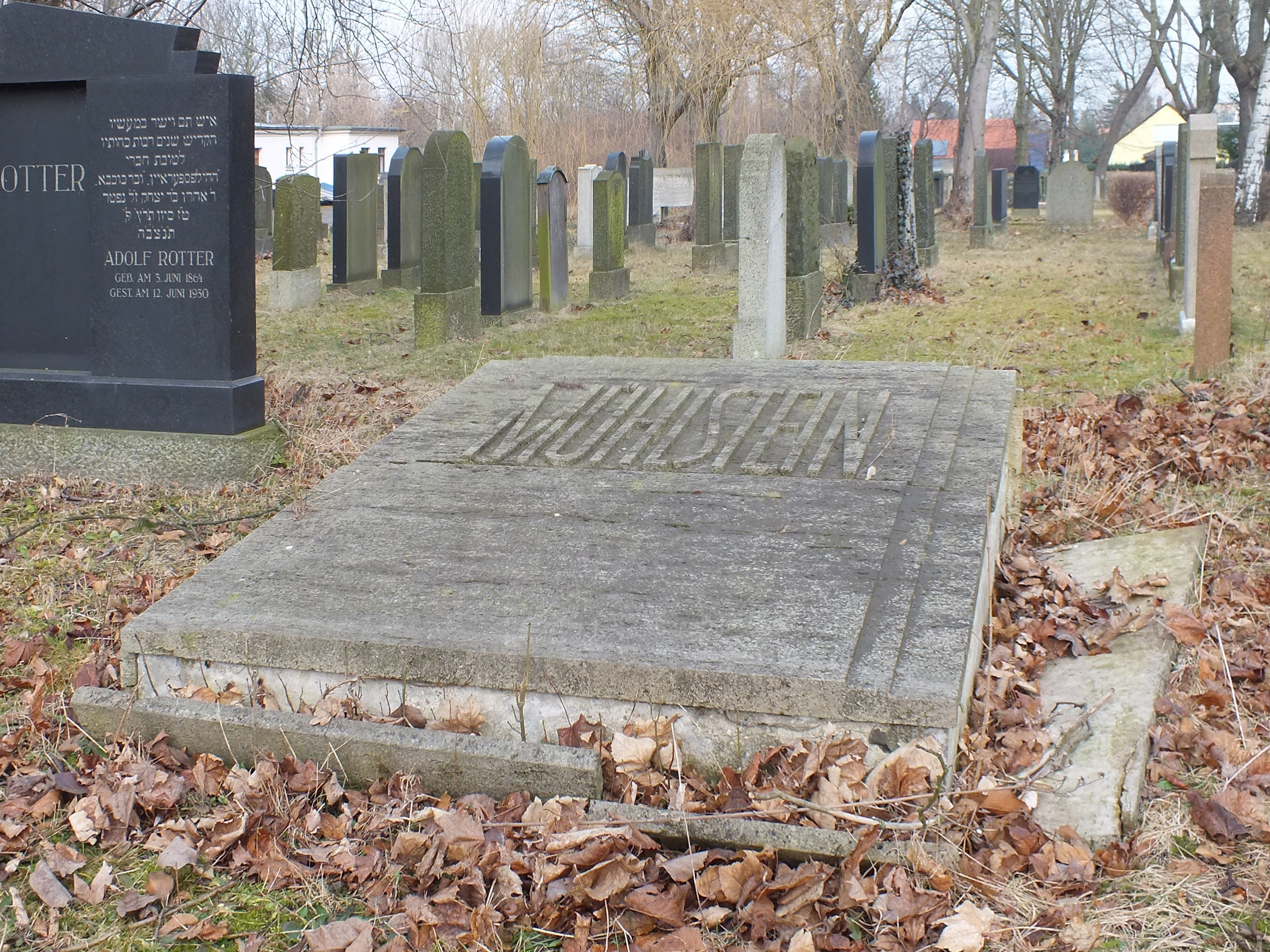
Grave according to Sephardic rites

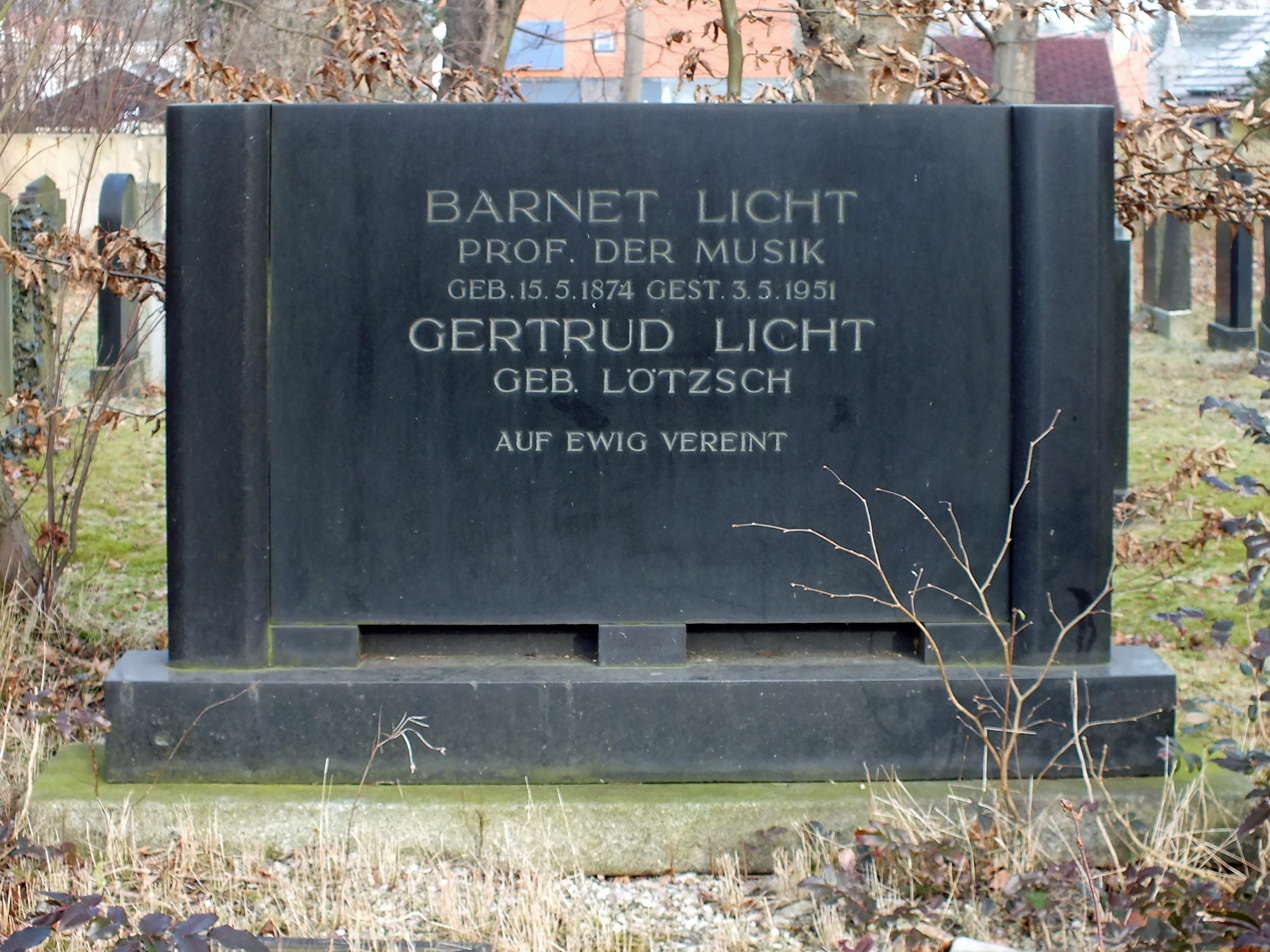
The grave of Barnet Licht

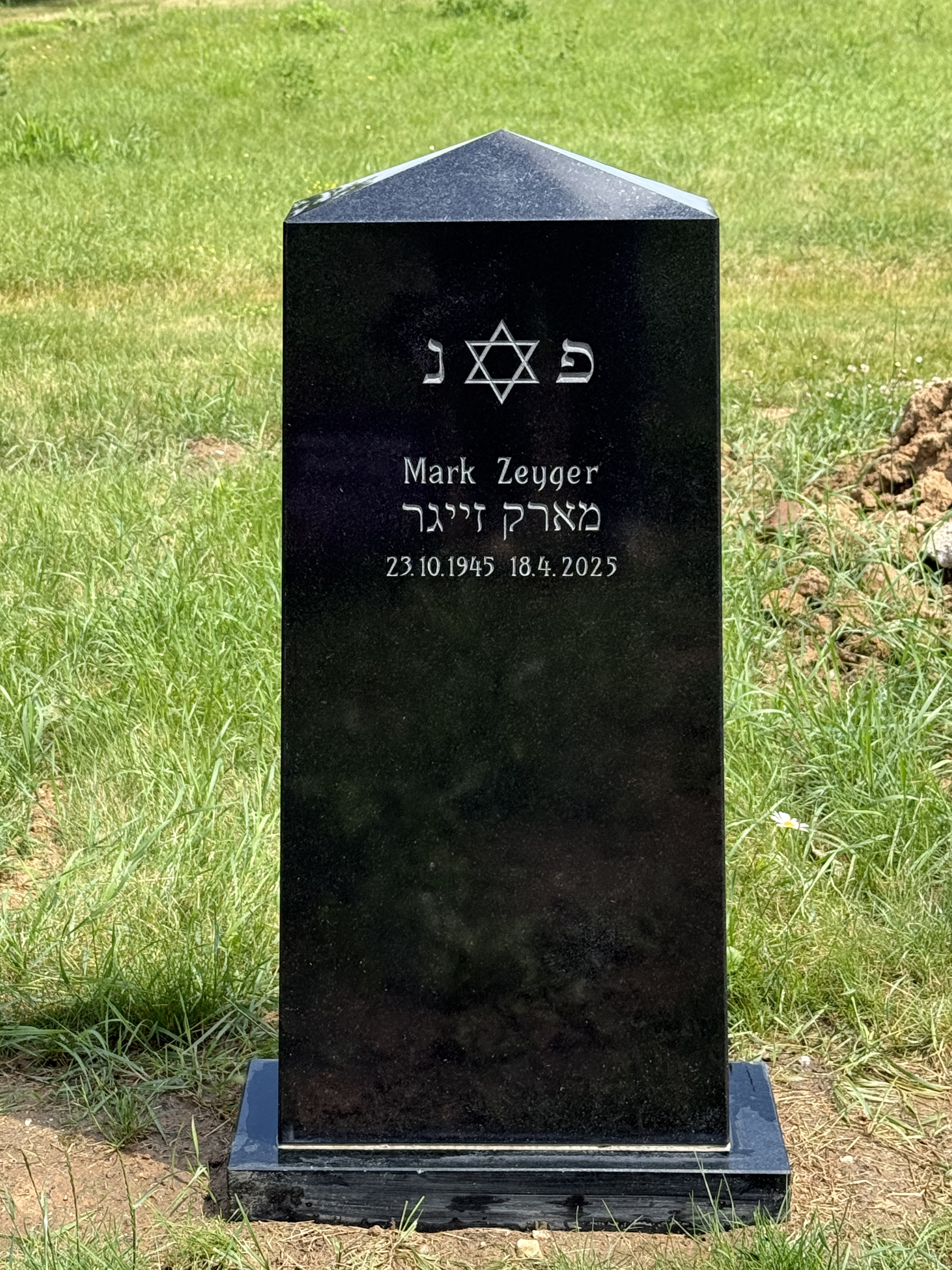
Mark Zeyger gravestone on New Jewish Cemetery

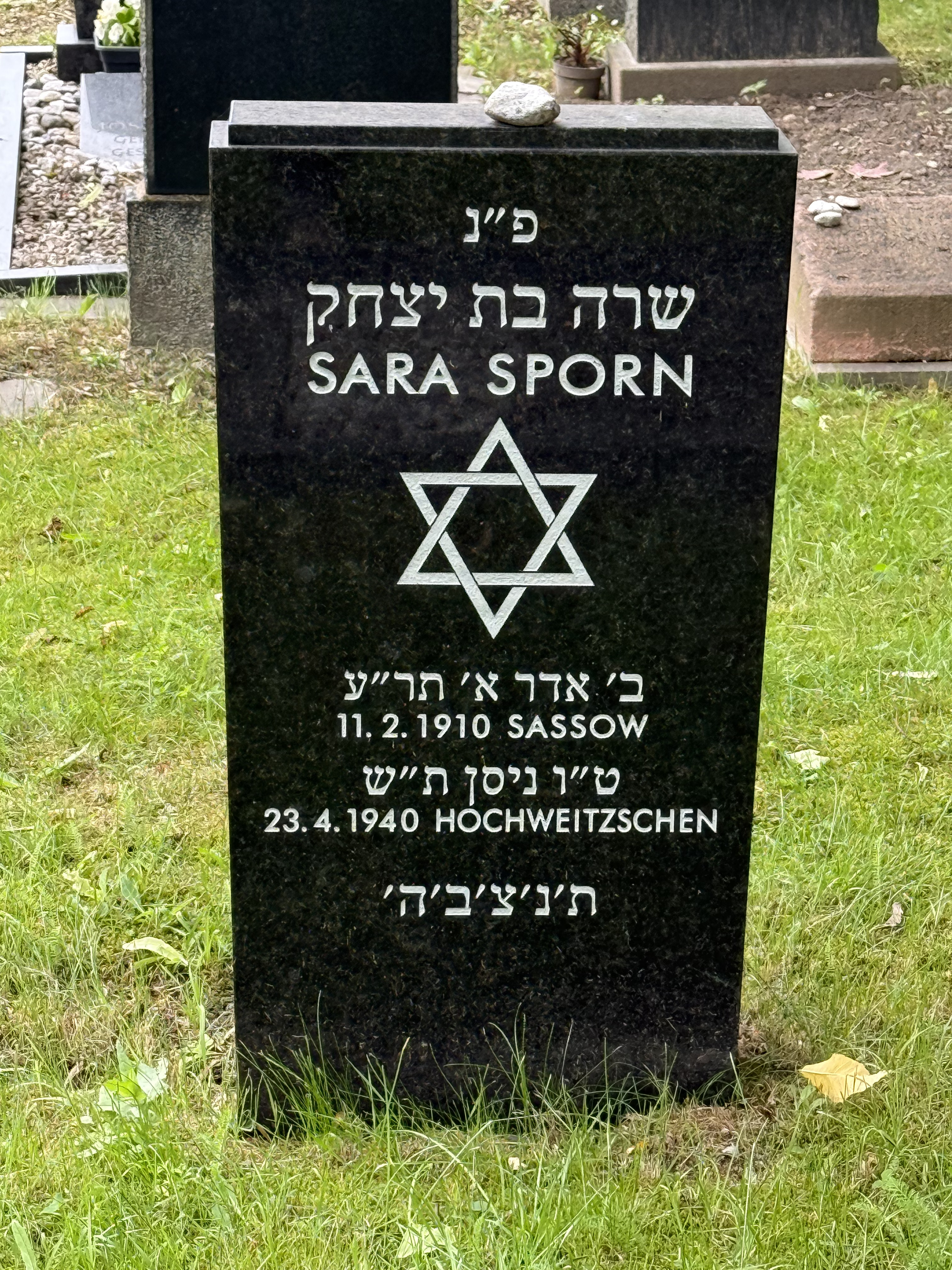
Sara Sporn Gravestone

Among the roughly 1,500 grave sites of the New Israelite Cemetery are also those of the well-known choral conductor Barnet Licht, the founder of the Leipzig Synagogal Choir Werner Sander, and the founder of the Leipzig Eitingon Hospital Chaim Eitingon. In the rear part stand the historic gravestones from the first Jewish cemetery of Leipzig. Among the gravestones of more recent date, Russian Jewish names predominate, since the Jewish community in Leipzig is composed mostly of Russian immigrants.

== See also ==
- History of the Jews in Leipzig
