= Joseph Barsky =

Israeli architect (died 1943)

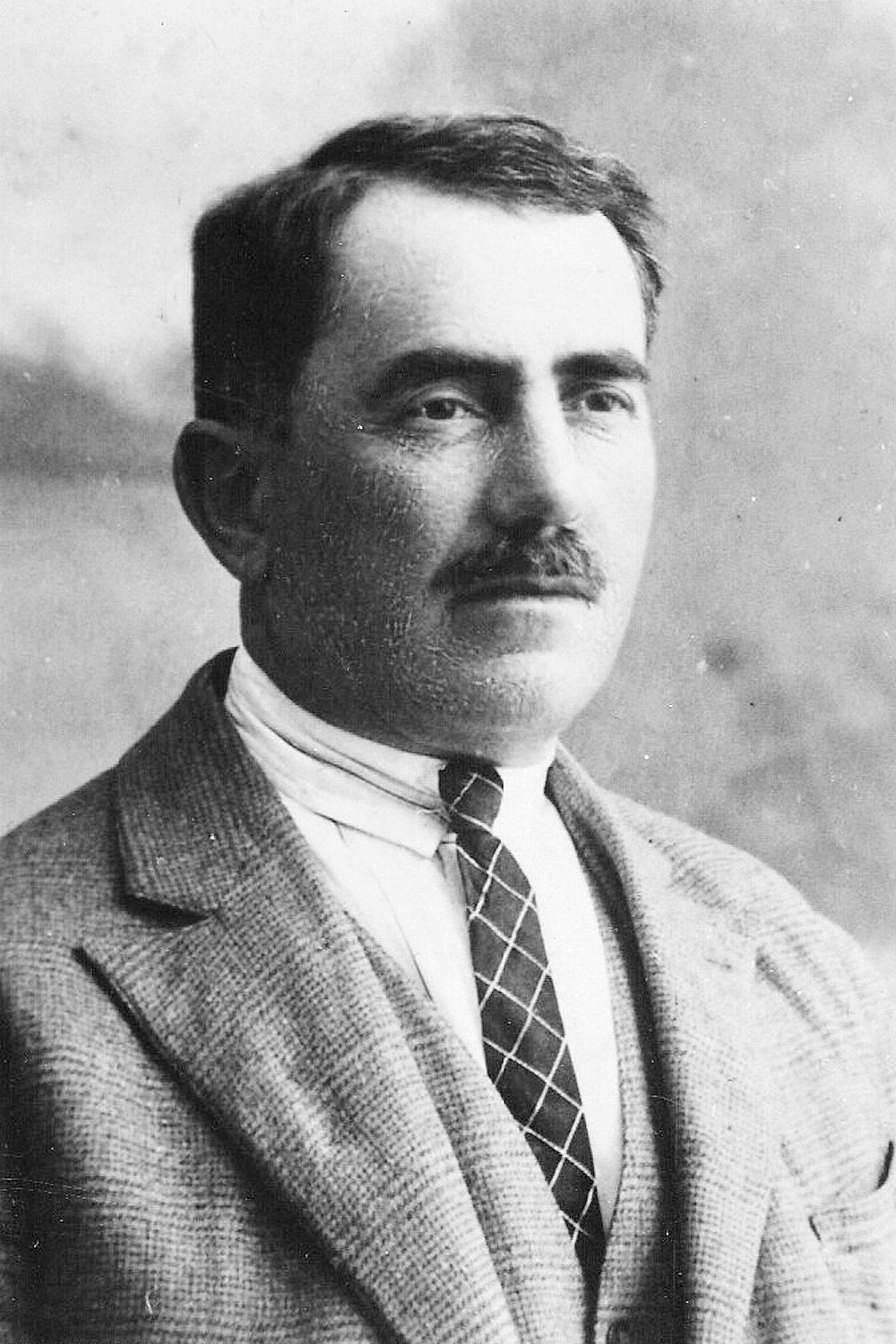
- Joseph Barsky, 1925
- Born: Odessa, Russian Empire (now Ukraine)
- Died: 1943; Haifa, Palestine (now Israel)
- Education: Grekov Odessa Art school, Imperial Academy of Arts
- Occupation: Architect
- Buildings: Herzliya Hebrew High School, Tel Aviv; The first kiosk in Tel Aviv; Bikur Cholim Hospital, Jerusalem; Diskin Orphanage, Jerusalem

Joseph Barsky (Hebrew: יוסף ברסקי, Odessa, Russian Empire – 1943 in Haifa, Palestine) was an architect in Ottoman and Mandatory Palestine.

Barsky was a graduate of the Architectural College in Grekov Odessa Art school of Odessa and the St. Petersburg Imperial Academy of Art. He came to Ottoman Palestine in 1907 and from that time on lived and worked in Jerusalem. He was one of the most renowned representatives of the Zionist architects of the Eretz Yisrael style.

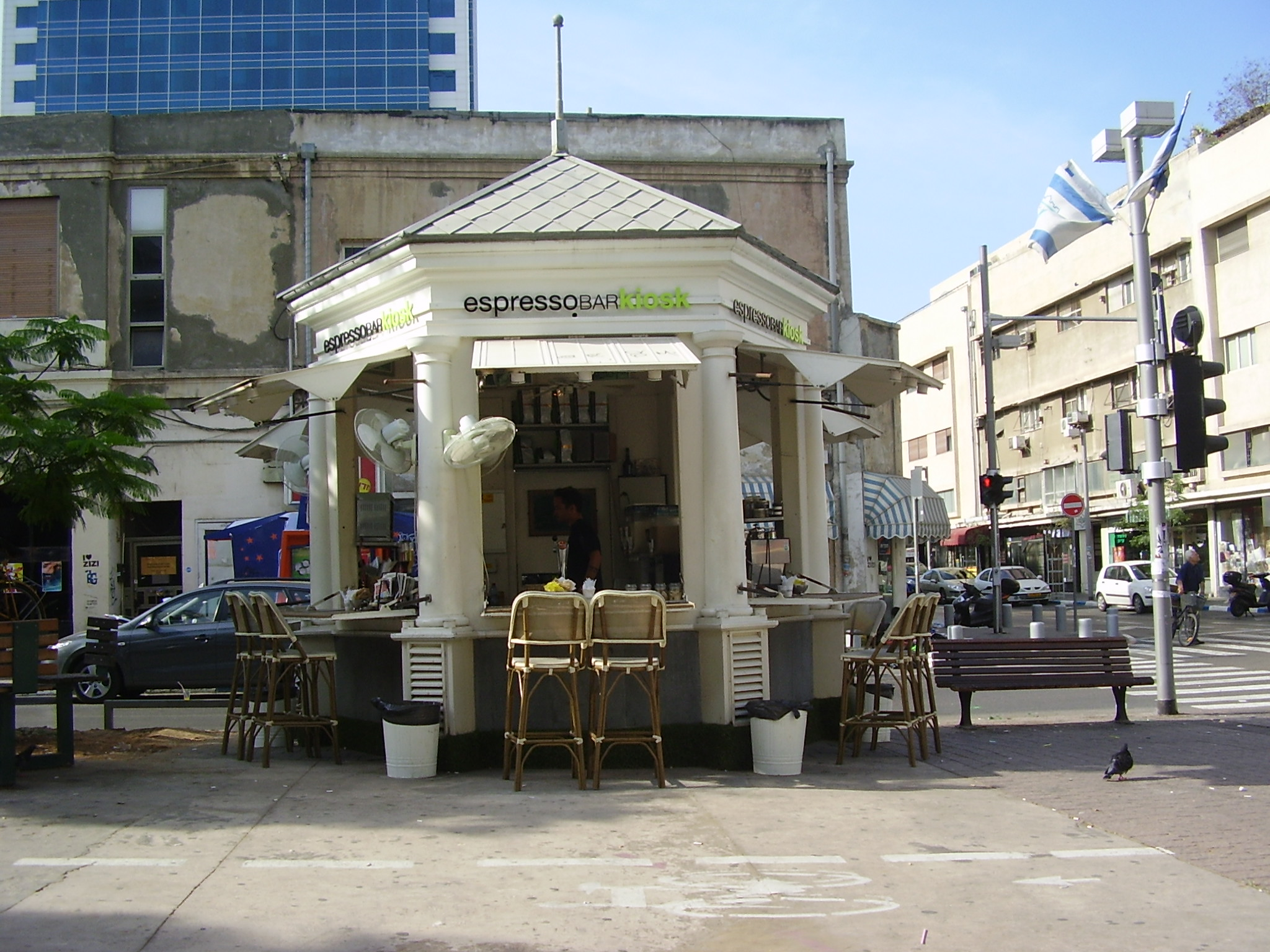
The first kiosk in Tel Aviv, built by Joseph Barsky in 1910. Photo from 2010.

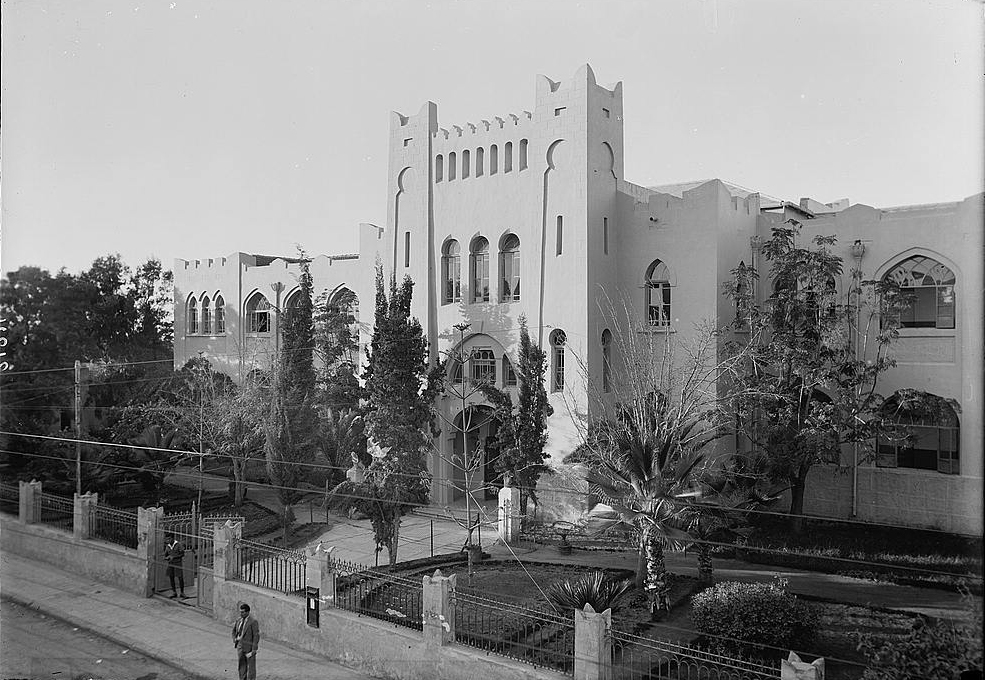
Herzliya Hebrew Gymnasium, Tel Aviv, old building, about 1936

== Notable buildings ==
- Herzliya Hebrew High School, Tel Aviv (demolished in 1962)
- The first kiosk in Tel Aviv at the middle of the Rothschild Boulevard
- Bikur Cholim Hospital, Jerusalem
- Diskin Orphanage, Jerusalem
