= Shklov district =

District of Mogilev region, Belarus

Coordinates: 54°12′30″N 30°17′13″E

Shklow district Шклоўскі раён (Belarusian) Шкловский район (Russian)
- District
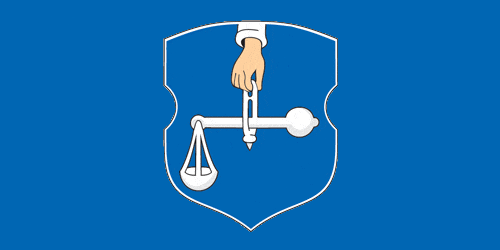
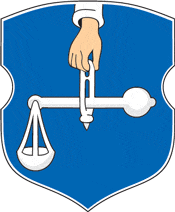
- Flag Coat of arms

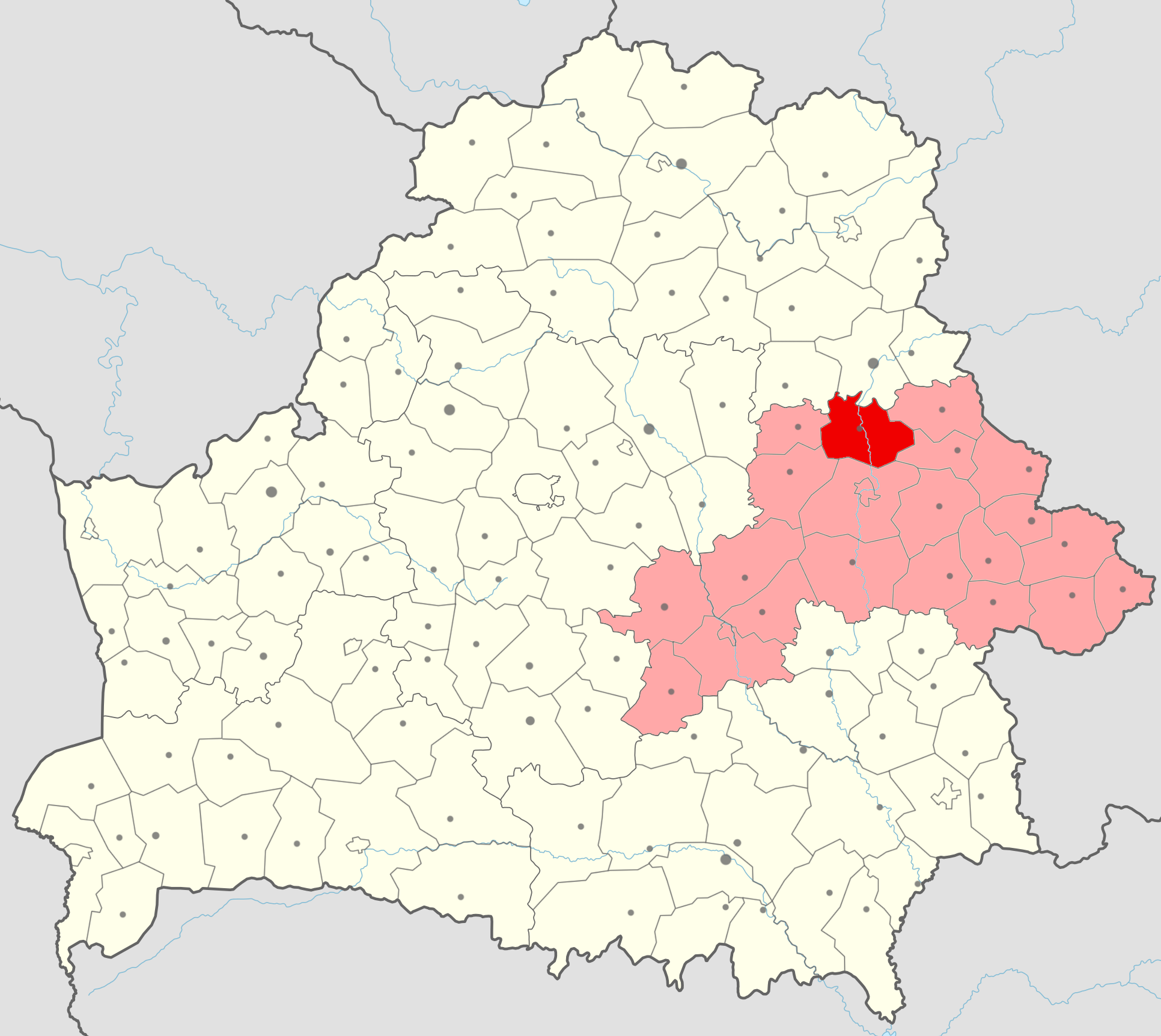
- Country: Belarus
- Region: Mogilev region
- Administrative center: Shklow

Area
  - Total: 1,334.17 km^{2} (515.13 sq mi)

Population (2023)
  - Total: 24,538
  - Density: 18.392/km^{2} (47.635/sq mi)
- Time zone: UTC+3 (MSK)

Shklow district or Škloŭ district (Belarusian: Шклоўскі раён; Russian: Шкловский район, romanized: Shklovsky rayon) is a district (raion) of Mogilev region in Belarus. The administrative center is the town of Shklow. As of 2009, its population was 30,802. The population of Shklow accounts for 53.4% of the district's population.
