= Diskin Orphanage =

Orphanage in Jerusalem established in 1881

Coordinates: 31°47′24.77″N 35°11′42.44″E

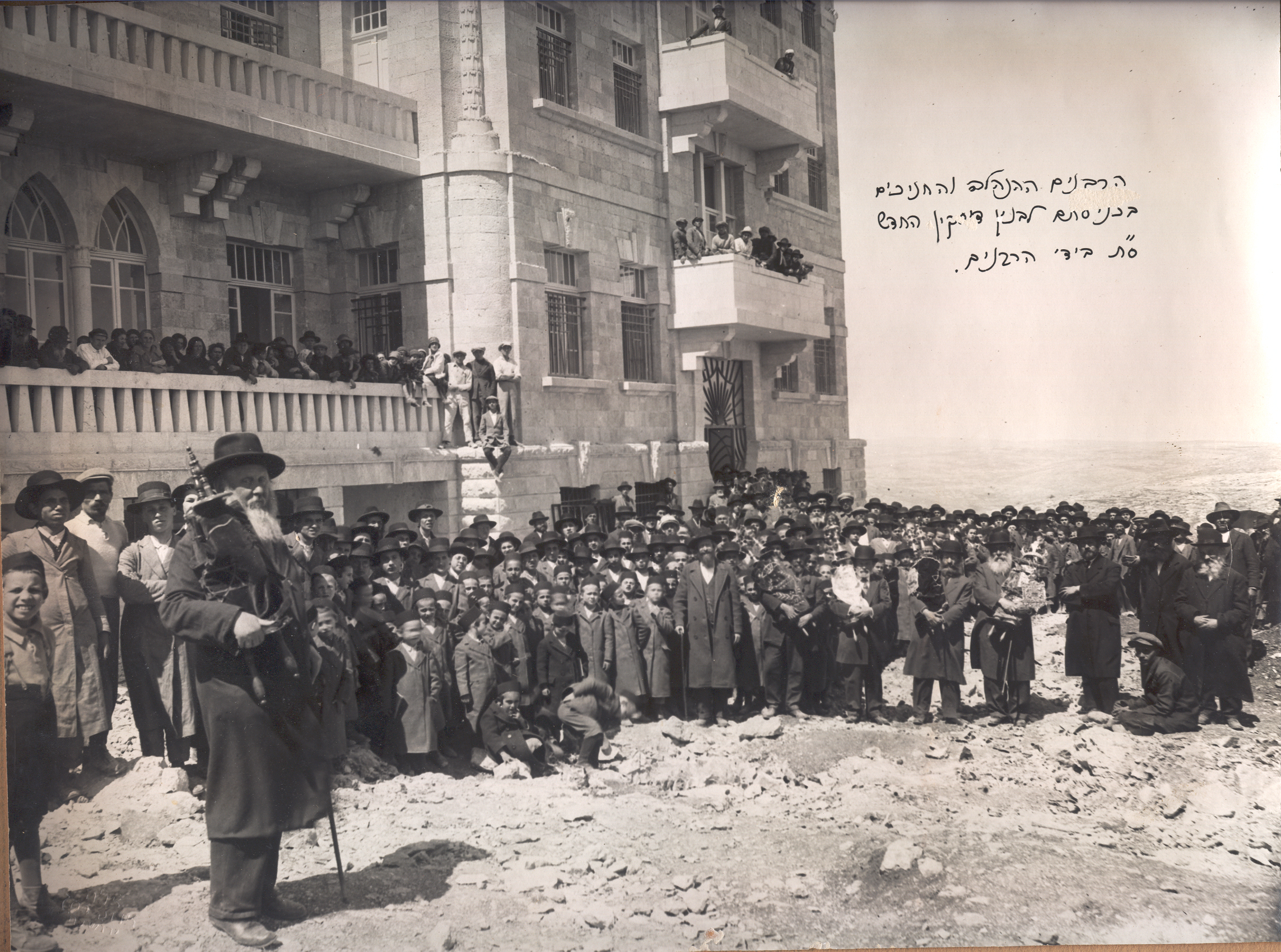
- Diskin Orphanage in 1927
- Formation: 1881; 145 years ago
- Founder: Yehoshua Leib Diskin
- Type: Non-profit
- Headquarters: Jerusalem, (Ottoman Empire) Ottoman Palestine, Mandatory Palestine, Israel
- Location: Kiryat Moshe, Jerusalem
- Services: Providing orphans with clothing, dental care, hot meals, and educational guidance

The Diskin Orphanage was an orphanage in the Old City of Jerusalem, established in 1881 by Yehoshua Leib Diskin. From the Jewish Quarter, it moved to Street of the Prophets outside the walls of the Old City. In 1927, it moved to a new building in the Kiryat Moshe neighborhood, near the main entrance to the city from the west.

== History ==
In 1878, Rabbi Yehoshua Leib Diskin left his rabbinical position in Brest-Litovsk and moved to Palestine, where he found a large religious community living under near impossible conditions. The persecution and disease from which the Jews of the Holy Land suffered moved Diskin to open a home for orphans in the city, after bringing needy children into his own home.

In time, as the number of children increased, Diskin established the "Great Institution for Orphans" that came to be known as the Diskin Orphanage of Jerusalem. Diskin's second wife, Sarah-Sonia, known as the Brisker Rebbetzin, brought 40,000 rubles into the marriage which was used for this purpose. When Diskin died in 1898, his lifework was continued by his only son, Yitzhak Yerucham Diskin. Rabbi Yitzhak built the imposing Diskin Orphanage campus.

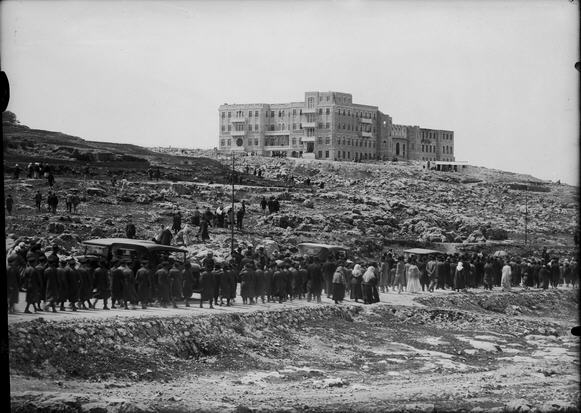
Diskin Orphanage moves to new premises 1927

Since then, the orphanage has undergone many changes. The building is rented by a boarding school. Today Beit Diskin operates as a non-profit organization that provides needy youngsters with clothing, dental care, hot meals and educational guidance.

=== 1927 building ===
The building for the Diskin Orphanage was designed by two architects: it was started by Joseph Barsky in 1908, and was continued by Joshua Zvi Tabachnik (Tavori). The campus was cited by Israeli architect and city historian David Kroyanker as one of the ten most beautiful buildings in Jerusalem.

== Child abuse enquiry ==
In 1949, an investigative reporter from the newspaper "Yom Yom", Ze'ev Tadmor, published an article, following his visit to the Orphanage. According to his description, the children lived in complete neglect, without toys and books and suffered punishments that included severe physical violence. Following the publication, a public campaign was launched to establish a commission of inquiry. As a result of the article, a storm arose and serious accusations were leveled at the Supervisor, Motel Ralbag. On the other hand, the ultra-Orthodox press defended him.

A state commission of inquiry headed by Justice Joshua Eisenberg, which included the director general of the Ministry of Education Baruch Ben-Yehuda and other personalities, was established on March 28, 1949.

The committee's conclusions were published on October 9, 1949 and confirmed most of the allegations of malnutrition, neglect, lack of toys, games and trips and extremely severe physical punishment. Following the publication of the committee's conclusions, the Ministry of Education decided to force a comprehensive administrative change on the institution, but the institution's directors refused to implement it and it was decided to prosecute them, in the Jerusalem District Court. During the trial the parties reached a compromise agreement. The agreement signed with the existing management of the institution, in fact, repealed the first and main recommendation of the commission of inquiry: to elect a new management for the institution, instead of the one responsible for the situation. The conclusions and other recommendations of the Commission of Inquiry were accepted in the Compromise Agreement by both parties. The recommendations were divided according to the three areas of work to the three ministries: health and hygiene matters for the Ministry of Health, education arrangements and its supervision for the Ministry of Education and Culture, boarding school and trainee life after school hours for the Ministry of Welfare. Each of the ministries was required to oversee its area of operation, and was entitled under the agreement to issue an amendment or change in the management of the institution within its area of operation and within the framework of the committee's recommendations. In addition, it was discovered during the affair that a man who worked as a tailor at an institution committed indecent acts on a number of students and was sentenced to two years in prison.

== Bibliography ==
- Menachem Mendel (1992). Pillar of Fire: Episodes in the Life of the Brisker Rav, Rabbi Yehoshua Leib Diskin. Mesorah Publications. ISBN 0-89906-847-2.
