= Shklovsky =

Shklovsky or Shklovskii is a Russian surname.

- Boris Shklovskii (born 1944), a Russian theoretical physicist
- Iosif Shklovsky (1916–1985), a Russian astrophysicist
- Isaak Vladimirovich Shklovsky (1864–1935), a Russian journalist
- Viktor Shklovsky (1893–1984), a Russian writer
