= Isaak Vladimirovich Shklovsky =

Russian journalist (1864–1935)

Isaak Vladimirovich Shklovsky (1864–1935) was a Russian-English journalist with an international reputation, often writing under the pen name Dioneo.

== Life ==
Shklovsky was born in Russia in 1864. After conviction as a "revolutionist" he was exiled to Siberia, 1886–1892. He lived in England from 1896 onwards, and became best known for his writing about life in Britain. Before the Bolshevik Revolution he wrote for the liberal Moscow daily Russkie Vedomosti and monthly Russkoye Bogatstvo, later contributing to Russian periodicals published in the diaspora and to the New York Yiddish magazine Die Zukunft.

== Writings ==
- In Far North-East Siberia (1916)
- Russia under the Bolsheviks (1919)
