= Aryeh Leib ben Asher Gunzberg =

Aryeh Leib ben Asher Ginzberg (also Günzburg or Wallerstein) (Hebrew: אריה ליב גינצבורג) (c. 1695 – June 23, 1785), also known as the Shaagas Aryeh, was a Lithuanian rabbi and author.

== Life ==
Born in Lithuania c. 1695, he was a rabbinical casuist. At one time, Ginzberg was a rabbi in Pinsk, and then later founded a yeshivah in Minsk. Here, however, he engaged in hostile dispute with the Gaon Yechiel Halpern, whose supporters eventually drove Ginzberg from the city. Legend has it that the Shaagas Aryeh was run out of the city of Minsk on an oxen cart. Due to the insult, as he left the city, he remarked, "What, Minsk isn't burning yet?" For years, fires that broke out were attributed by the Jews of Minsk to the curse of the Shaagas Aryeh.

His most famous book, Shaagas Aryeh (Hebrew: שאגת אריה, 'roar of a lion'), a collection of responsa, was first published in Frankfurt am Main in 1755 and is still frequently quoted in rabbinical debates, as are many of his responsa. After its publication, he became known as "the Shaagas Aryeh" after his book.

Ginzberg officiated as rabbi of Volozhin between 1750 and 1755, but he didn't get along with the community leaders. After that, he spent some time in Frankfurt and Berlin and ultimately returned to Volozhin, where Reb Chaim of Volozhin studied under him for some time. In 1765 he became rabbi in Metz in France, but an early argument with his congregation led to him refusing to enter the synagogue except to give four sermons a year. Despite this, he retained his post until he died in Metz on June 23, 1785.

Hasidim considered the Shaagas Aryeh "the definitive talmid hakham (great leader) of the generation." They maintain a legend that the Besht sought out the Shaagas Aryeh and "served him by putting his shoes on for him".

A famous legend about his death relates that a bookcase fell on him during his studies. After an hour or so, his students rescued him, and he told them that he had been covered by the books of the authors with whom he had quarreled. He had asked forgiveness from all of them, and they all complied save for one, Mordecai Yoffe (known as the Levush), who refused. He knew therefore that he was not long for this world, and pronounced the verse in Hebrew "Aryeh sha'ag mi lo yir'a"; i.e. that Aryeh (the lion, meaning himself) sha'ag (roars), but mi (an acronym of Mordecai Yoffeh, but can also mean 'who') lo yir'a (is not afraid).

It is speculated that this legend is the source of the urban myth surrounding the death of the French-Jewish composer Charles-Valentin Alkan, whose family originated from Metz.

== Works ==
- Shaagas Aryeh – halachic discussions in the form of questions and answers, mostly on the topics of Orach Chaim
- Gevuras Ari – glosses to Ta'anit, Yoma, Makkot (published Vilna, 1862)
- Turei Even – glosses to the Talmudic tractates Rosh haShanah, Hagigah, and Megillah (published 1781)
