= Nordvorstadt (Leipzig) =

- Stadtteil of Leipzig
- Interactive map of Nordvorstadt
- Location within Germany Location within Saxony
- Coordinates: 51°21′11.35″N 12°22′28.98″E
- Country: Germany
- State: Saxony
- District: Urban district
- City: Leipzig

Area
  - Total: 1.31 km^{2} (0.51 sq mi)

Population (2024-12-31)
  - Total: 9,984
  - Density: 7,620/km^{2} (19,700/sq mi)
- Time zone: UTC+01:00 (CET)
  - Summer (DST): UTC+02:00 (CEST)
- Postal codes: 04155
- Dialling codes: 0341

The Nordvorstadt (German pronunciation: [ˈnɔʁtfoːɐ̯ˌʃtat], lit. 'Northern Vorstadt') in Leipzig in Germany is an area north of the city center and belongs to the borough (Stadtbezirk) of Leipzig-Mitte. The designation is not official. The Nordvorstadt stretches from the Inner City Ring Road to the boundaries of the former villages and today's Leipzig localities of Gohlis and Eutritzsch. It had its origins in the former tanners' quarter. The Nordvorstadt was incorporated into Leipzig in 1839 and developed according to plan from 1868/1869. With minor deviations, their area corresponds to the locality of Zentrum-Nord defined in Leipzig's municipal structure of 1992.

== Location and location typology ==
The Nordvorstadt is bordered in the south by the Tröndlinring as the northern part of the Inner Cjty Ring Road, in the west by the Rosental and the Zoological Garden, in the north by Ehrensteinstraße and in the east by the railway tracks leading to Leipzig Hauptbahnhof, parallel to it the Berliner Strasse.

The main roads of the locality are Gerberstrasse and Eutritzscher Strasse, which run in a north-south direction, as well as Pfaffendorfer and Gohliser Strasse, which also accommodate the lines 12, 11 and 16 of the Leipzig tramway. As watercourses, the Parthe crosses the area only in the south.

From north to south, a wide, densely populated residential area stretches through the Nordvorstadt, dominated by villas in its northwestern part, while a closed construction method prevails for the rest. In the far south, the area takes on a large-scale character with office buildings and hotels. In the east, sharply demarcated, there are industrial and railway facilities, while in the west there are larger green areas through Rosental and Zoo.

== History ==
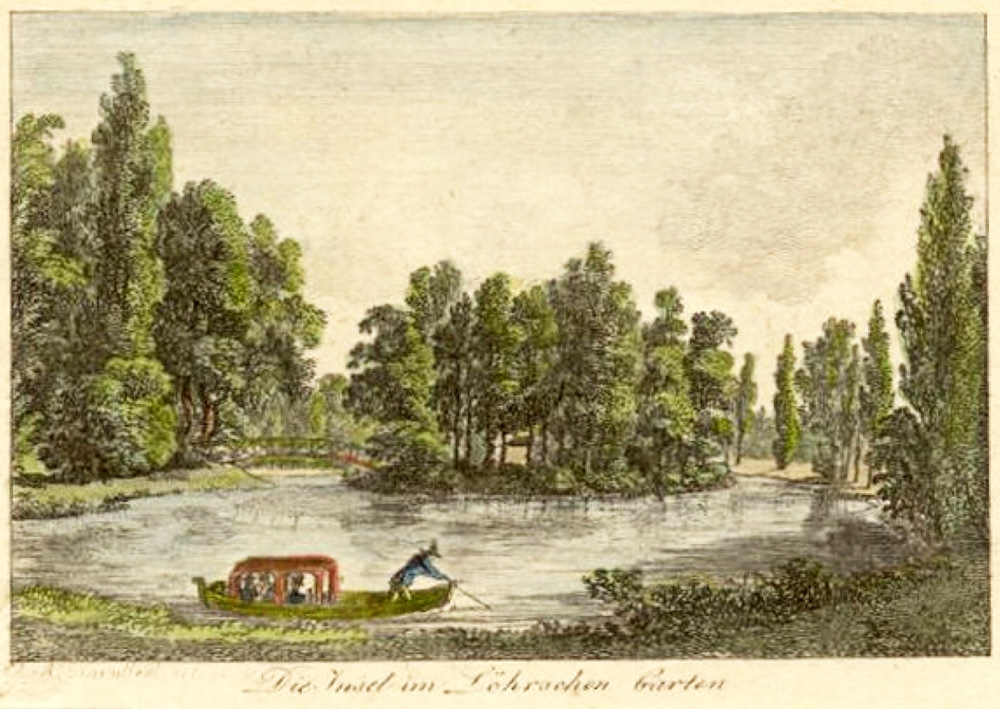
In Löhr's Garden (around 1850)

North of medieval Leipzig there was the Pfaffendorf folwark and in front of the Halle Gate there was a craftsmen's settlement that had been built for the tanners since the 12th century and used the water of the Parthe, from which the tanners' quarter developed from 1540 onwards, through which the trader's route Via Imperii ran. In 1797, the place was called Hallesche Vorstadt (after the city of Halle (Saale)) and the number of inhabitants was 1.114.

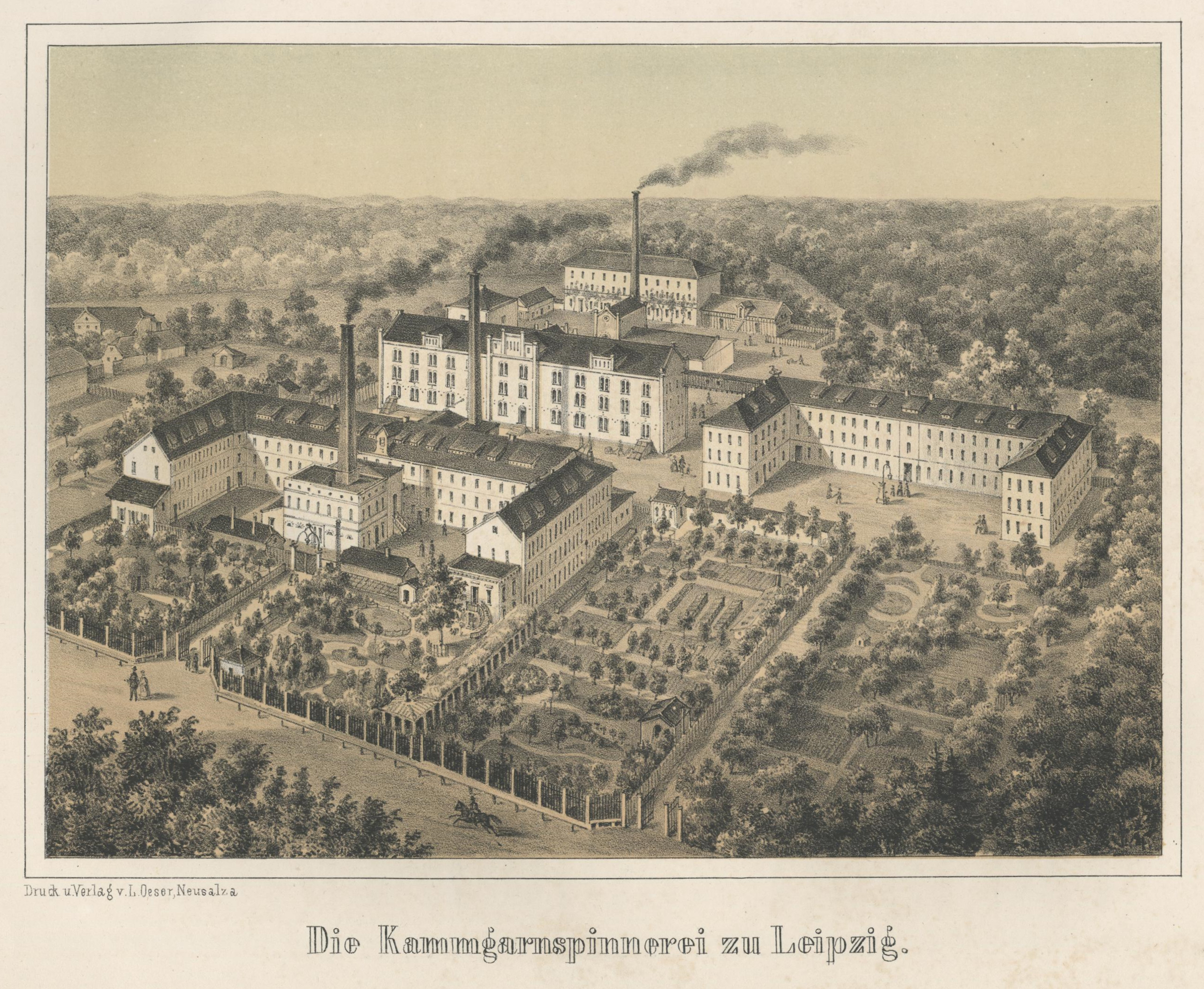
Worsted yarn spinning mill (1856)

On a large part of the land in between, the Leipzig banker Eberhard Heinrich Löhr (1725–1798) had his publicly accessible, park-like garden built in 1770. Through his marriage to Löhr's granddaughter Juliane Henriette in 1814, the Romanist and poet Johann Georg Keil came into possession of the garden, which he redesigned after the devastation caused by the Battle of the Nations. In the 1830s, the municipal gasworks was built north of the tanners' quarter and the most important German worsted yarn spinning mill at the Pfaffendorf folwark. Due to the construction of railway facilities in the east and also later construction measures, the Parthe had to be relocated several times.

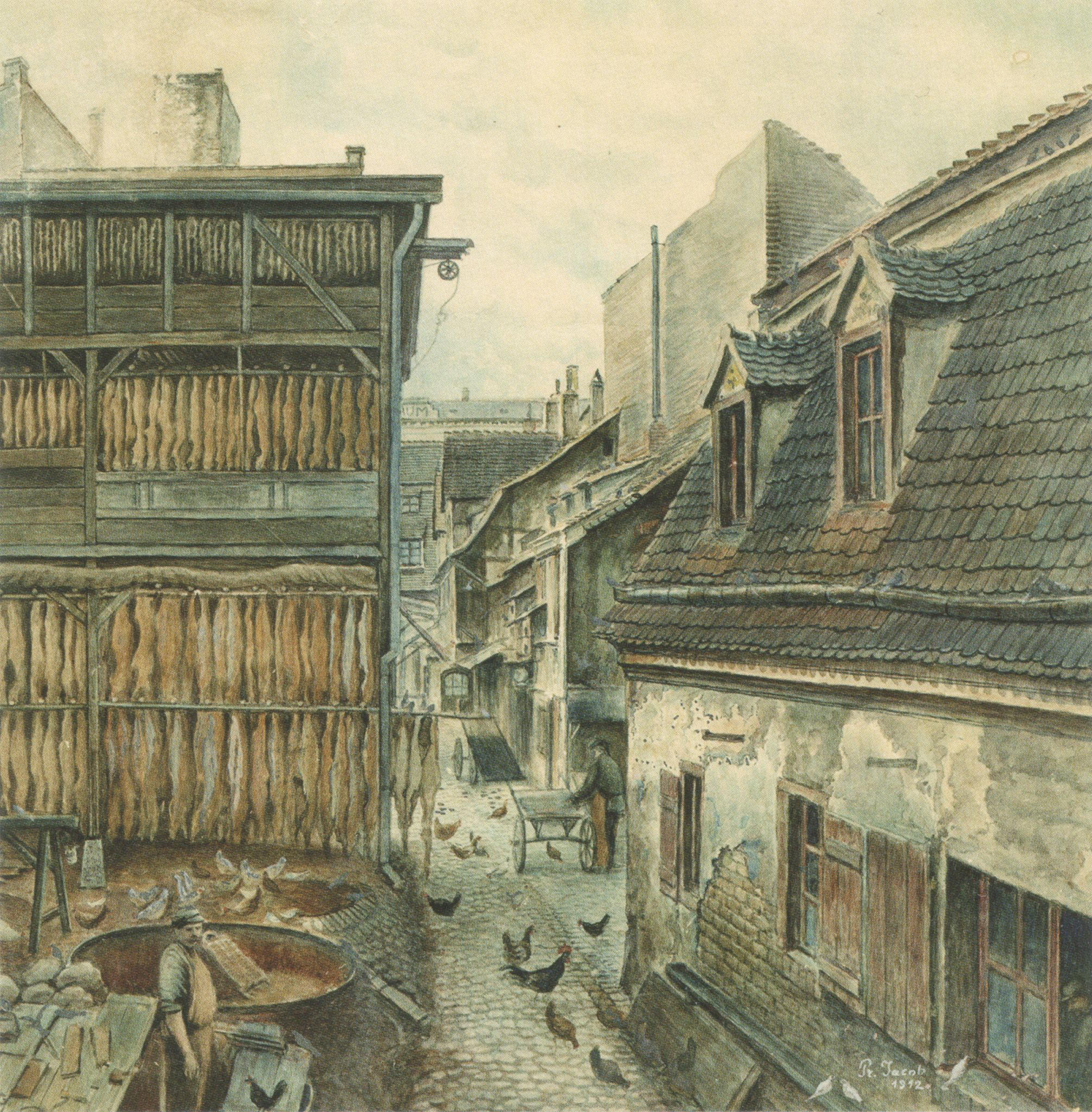
In the Tanners' Quarter (1912)

In 1839, the vorstadts of Leipzig were incorporated into the city, and the area of the Pfaffendorf folwark was incorporated into Leipzig in 1862. In 1868/1869, the city council drew up a development plan for the northern suburbs, in which the Nordplatz was designated as the centre of the area. In 1875, the Nordvorstadt had 11.799 inhabitants. From 1886 onwards, development began with the parcelling out of the Löhr's, now Keil's, garden, and thus much later than in the other vorstadts. Until about 1900, it reached as far as Nordplatz, where St. Michael's Church (Michaeliskirche) was built by 1904. After the Royal Saxon Army had given up its parade ground south of Gohlis, further building land was available up to the northern boundary of the field, on which mainly villas were built.

In the southern part of the Nordvorstadt, on the Tröndlinring and its surroundings, numerous representative buildings were erected from the mid-1880s onwards, such as the Neue Börse (1887, destroyed in the war in 1943), the Hotel Fürstenhof (1890), the Reformed Church (1899) through the conversion of the Löhr House, the Congress Hall (1900), the Municipal Pawnshop (1913, today the tax office), the Hotel Astoria (1914) and the Stadtbad (1916).

The Nordvorstadt, together with the Waldstraßenviertel, was a focus of the Jewish population in Leipzig. The area around Nordplatz was popularly known as "Jüdische Schweiz" (lit.: Jewish Switzerland). The poorest of them even lived above the horse stables in Gerberstrasse. The memorial to Jewish Citizens on Parthenstrasse commemorates the deportation and extermination.

In the Second World War, almost two-thirds of the buildings south of the Parthe were destroyed, while the northern part was only partially affected. By 1950, the Congress Hall had been restored, the Hotel Astoria had reopened and the Reformed Church had been rebuilt. Extensive demolitions of individual old buildings, which almost completely eliminated the Tanners' Quarter, made room for two ten-storey apartment blocks built east of Gerberstrasse between 1968 and 1970 and for the company building of VEB Robotron-Anlagenbau Leipzig (1968/1969), which has since been demolished. Opposite, the Japanese Kajima Corporation built the 27-storey Interhotel Merkur (now The Westin Leipzig) between 1979 and 1981.

After 1991, numerous new office buildings were built, including the 18-storey Löhrs Carré with the Sparkasse Leipzig headquarters and, until 2008, the Landesbank Sachsen (subsequently a branch of the Landesbank Baden-Württemberg). In 1996, the combined cycle power plant Kraftwerk Nord went into operation on the former gasworks site, where Leipzig's first power plant had also been built in 1893. In the adjacent industrial park, a mosque association operated the al-Rahman mosque in a prefabricated building from 1998 to 2025 before it moved to Rackwitzer Strasse.

On the former Robotron site with its square plot between Gerberstraßss and Nordstrasse, the new headquarters of the state-owned Development Bank of Saxony was completed in 2021. The five-storey building has an L-shaped floor plan. In the south and east of the property, 21 metres (69 ft) tall columns made of exposed concrete form a forest of columns. The property is open and can be traversed.

Buildings in the Nordvorstadt

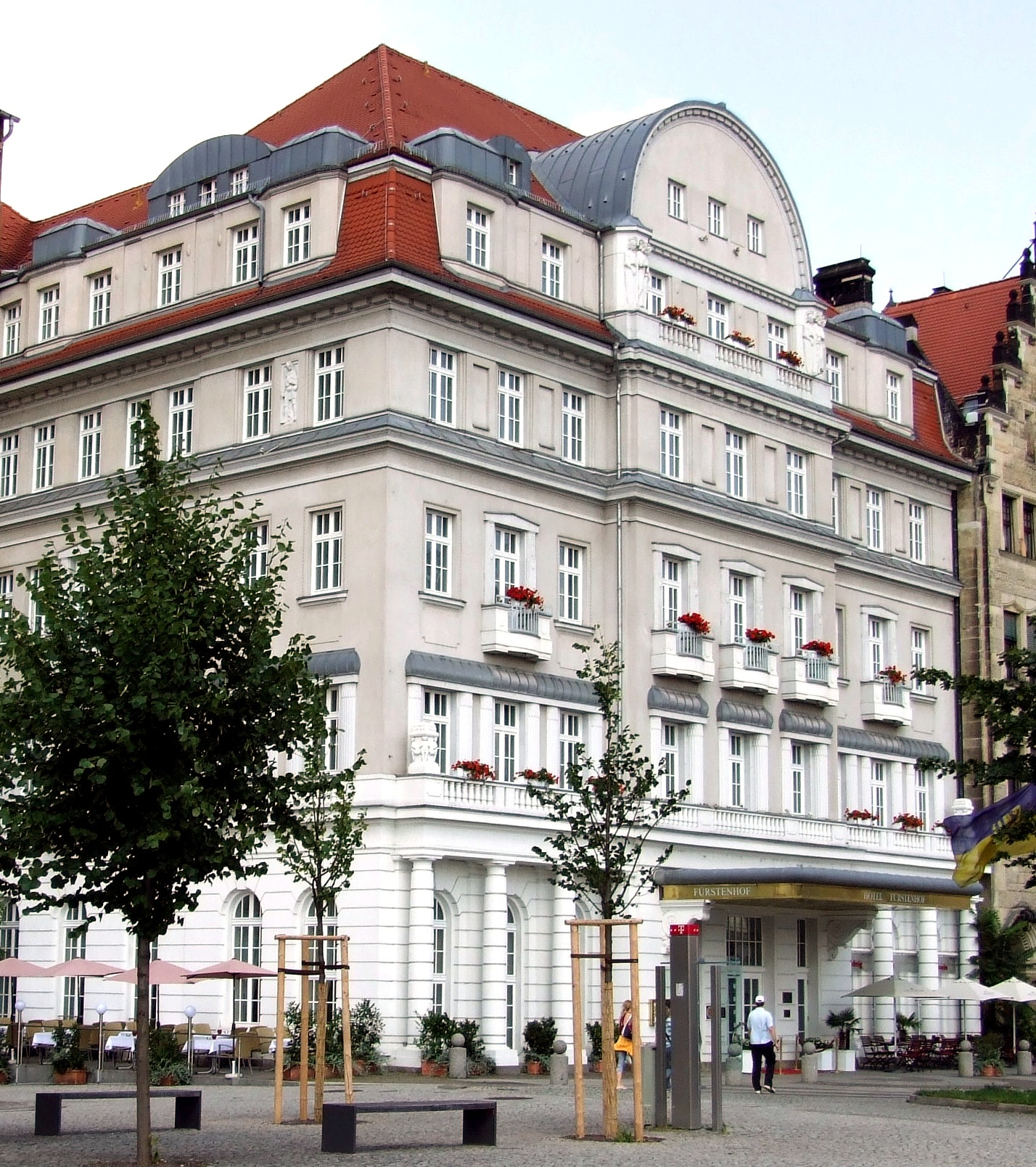
Hotel Fürstenhof (2008)

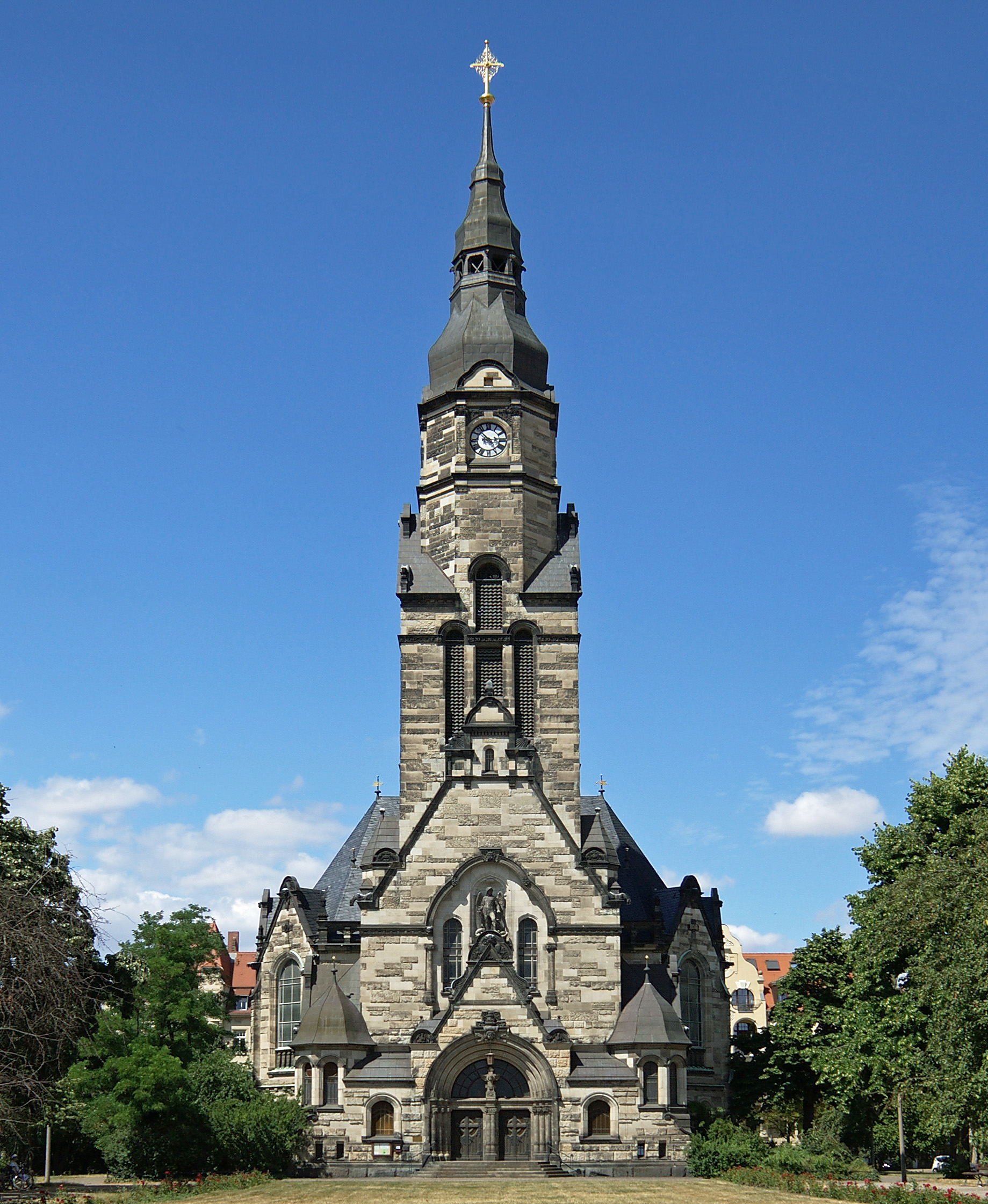
Michaeliskirche (St. Michael's Church) (2010)

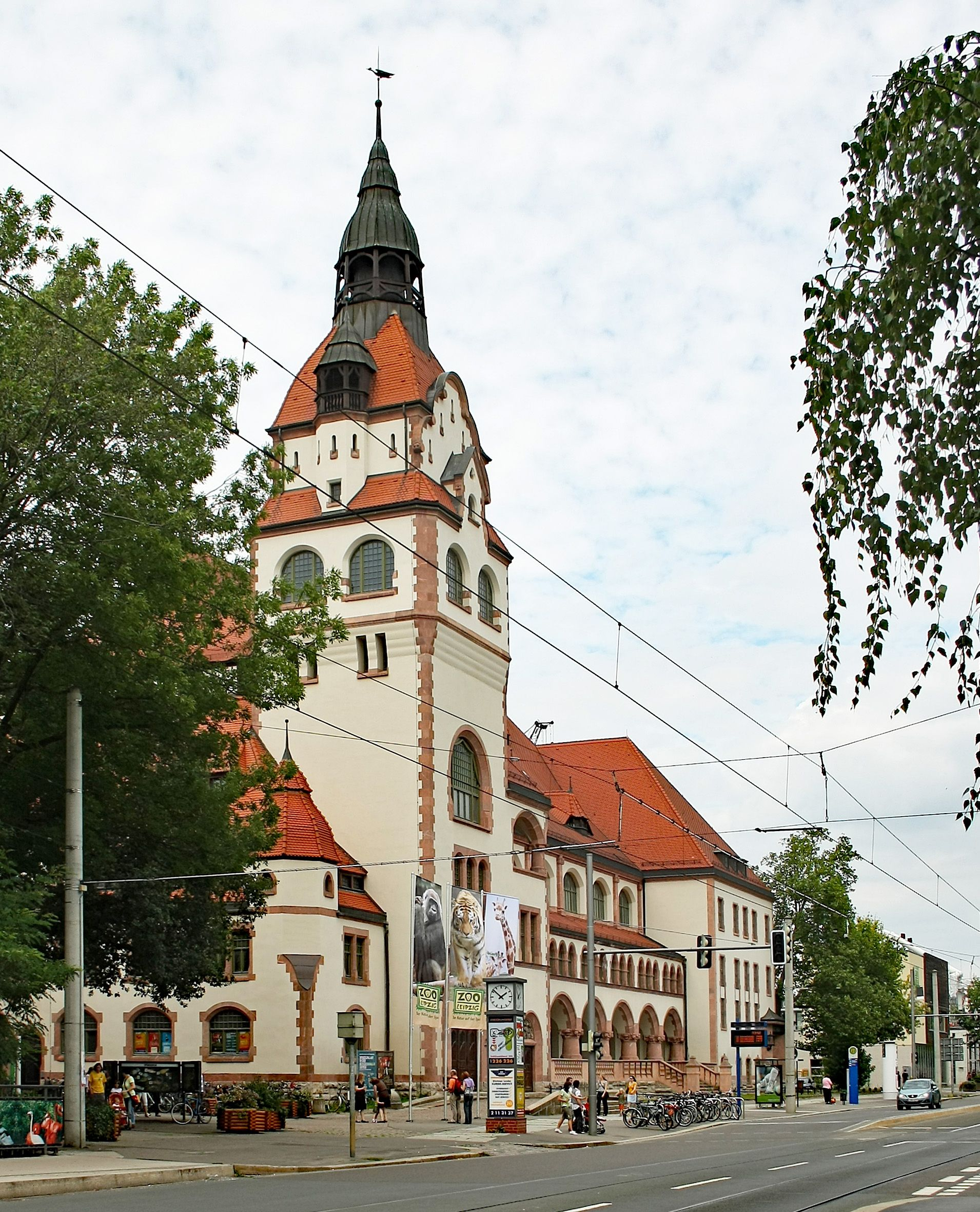
Kongreßhalle Leipzig (2009)

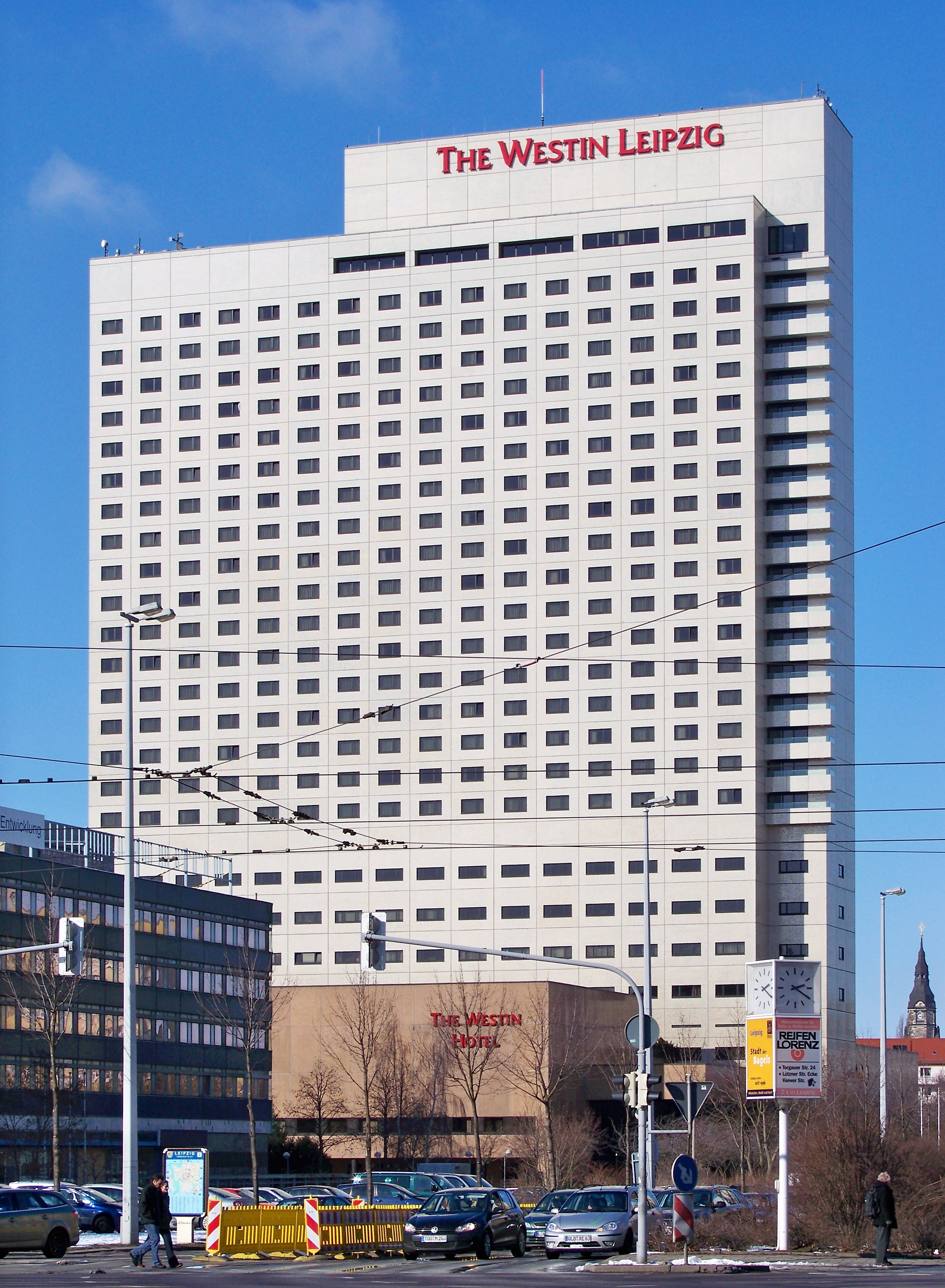
The Westin Leipzig (2010)

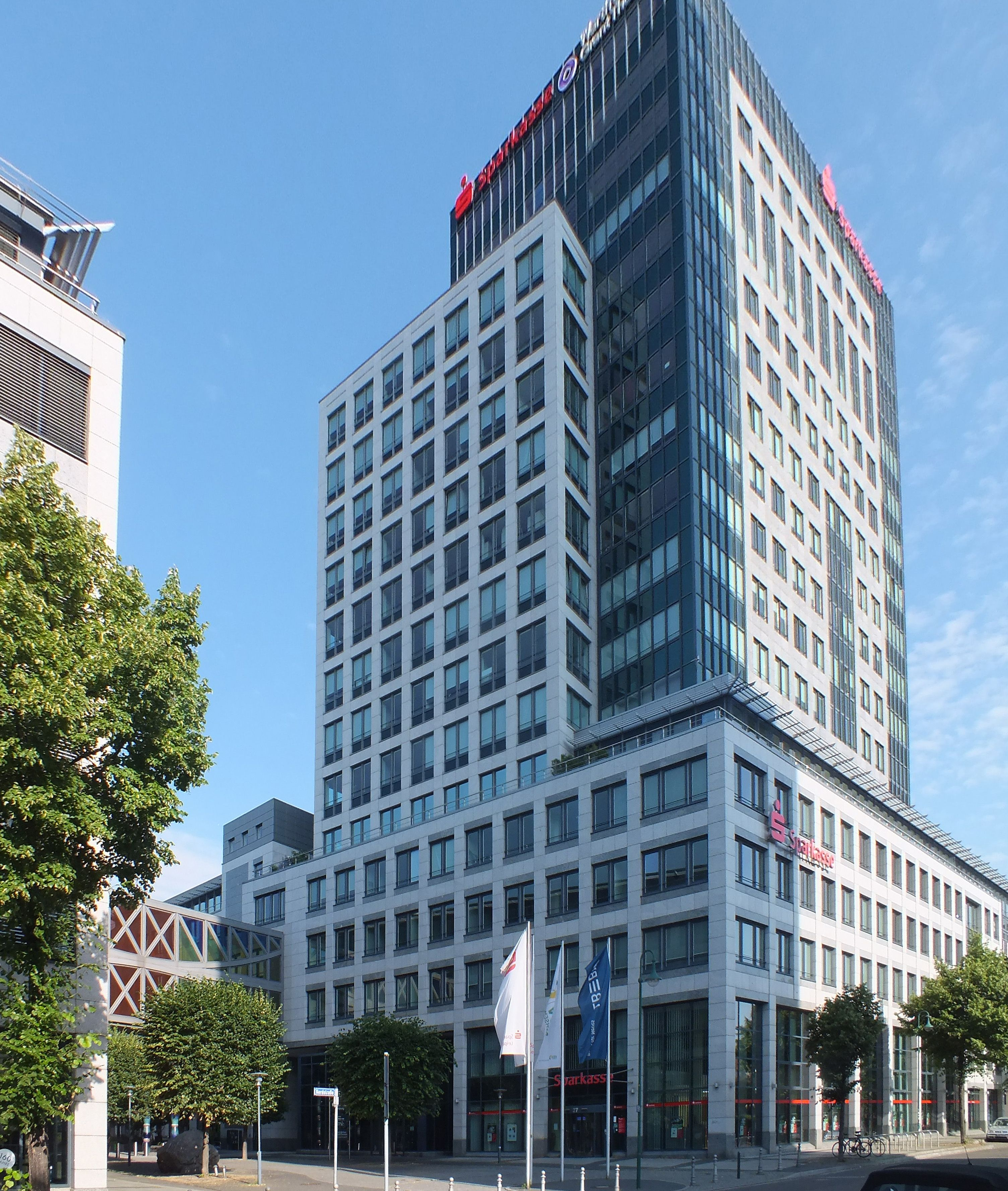
Löhrs Carré (2020)

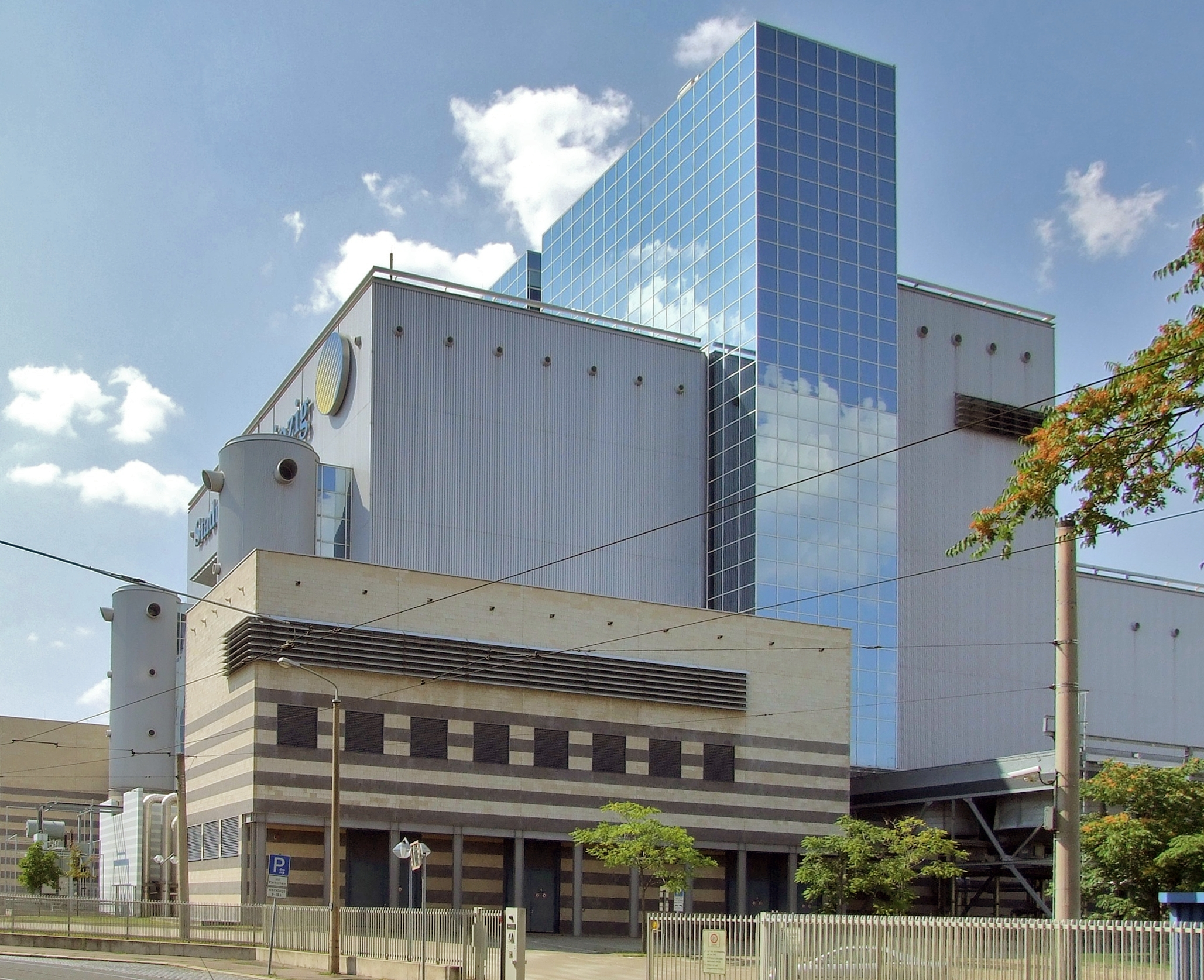
Kraftwerk Nord (2008)

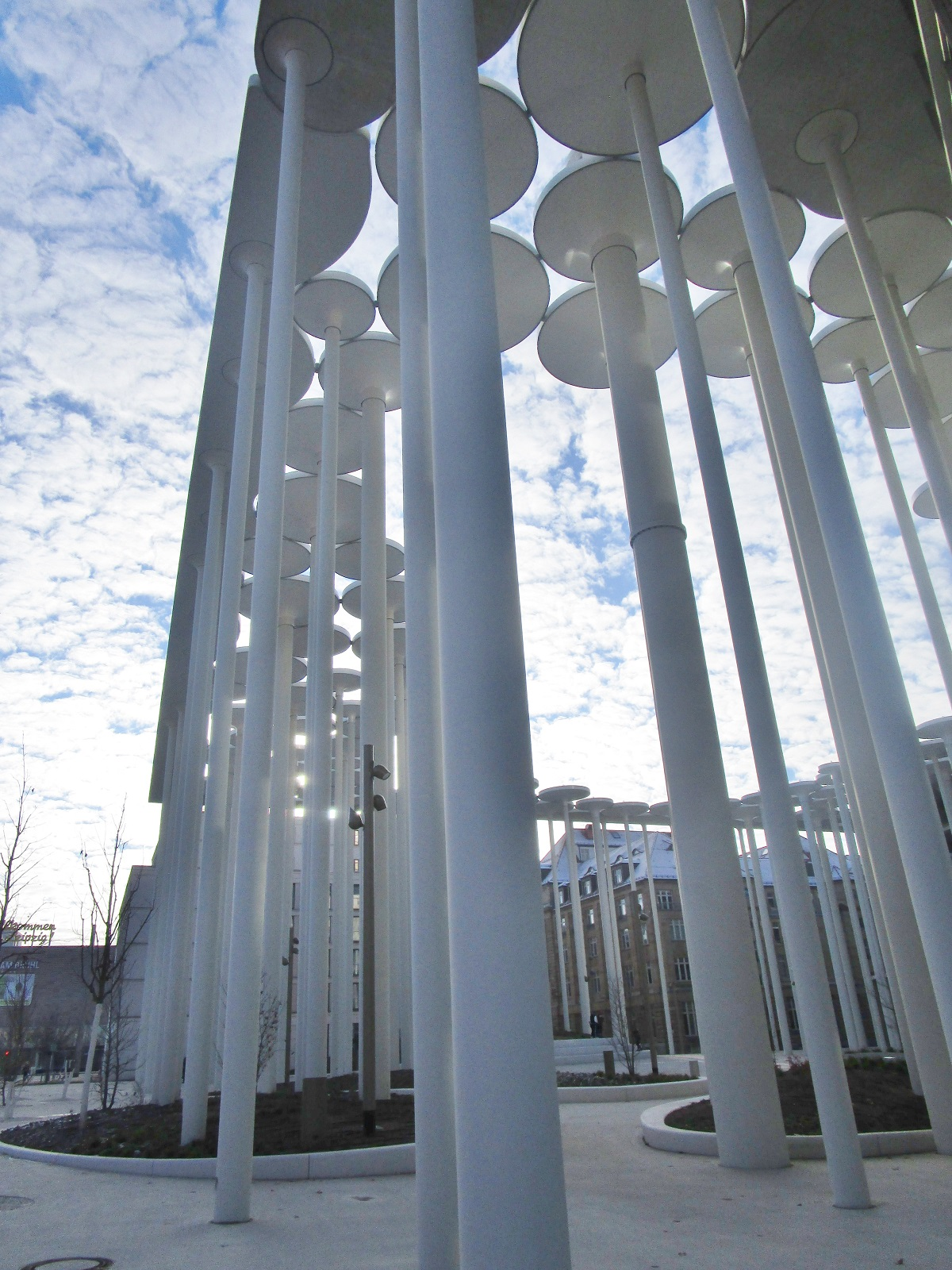
Sächsische Aufbaubank, forest of columns (2021)

== New urban quarters on former railway sites ==
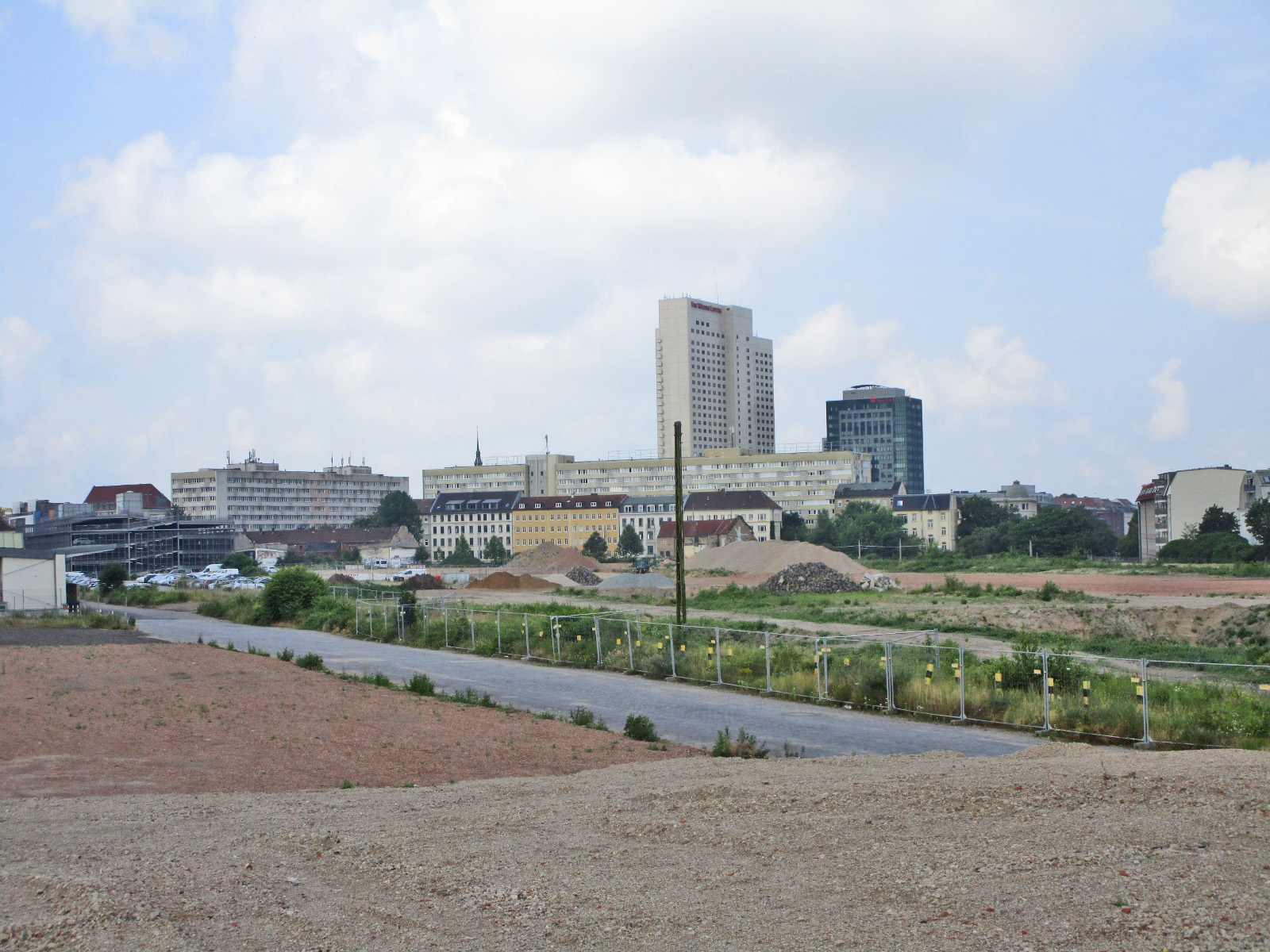
The site where the Löwitz Quartier is to be built (2021)

While there were previously no residential buildings east of Eutritzscher/Delitzscher Strasse, the city is pursuing the creation of new urban quarters on the eastside of the Nordvorstadt. The Löwitz Quartier immediately adjacent of the Central Railway Terminus is already under construction. Löwitz is a made-up word from Löwe (lion), the Leipzig charge, and -itz, the typical ending of Leipzig locality names. The 10.6 ha (26 acres) large area is bordered by Kurt-Schuhmacher-Strasse and Parthe. The development plan containing residential buildings, a five-class grammar school and the Parthepark as a public green space was adopted in 2019. The grammar school went into operation under the name "Gymnasium Hauptbahnhof Westseite" in August 2024.

Another planned neighbourhood of 25 ha (62 acres) and around 2000 apartments is on a derelict railway site further north. Under the name "Eutritzscher Freiladebahnhof" in the medias since the end of the 2010s, construction has not started yet (2025).

== Notable Nordvorstadt residents ==
A notable jewish resident in the vicinity of the Nordplatz was the mathematician Felix Hausdorff (1868-1942). The fur trader families Harmelin and Garfunkel, Mittelmann, Eitingon and Ariowitsch lived not far from each other. The fur traders were involved in the Jewish community, founded synagogues, a hospital and a home for the elderly. Jewish girls attended the Gaudigschule in Lumumbastrasse. The birthplace of Fritz Grübel, later head of the Leo Baeck Institute New York as Fred Grubel, stands on Nordplatz next to two so-called Judenhäuser in which Jewish families had to live before their deportation.

== See also ==
- List of tallest buildings in Leipzig

== Bibliography ==
- Brogiato, Peter; Haß, Katja (2024). Leipziger Spaziergänge. Nordvorstadt (in German). Leipzig: Lehmstedt Verlag. ISBN 978-3-95797-168-5.
- Kowalzik, Barbara (1999). Jüdisches Erwerbsleben in der Inneren Nordvorstadt Leipzigs 1900-1933 [Jewish Working Life in the Inner Northern Vorstadt of Leipzig 1900-1933] (in German). Leipzig: Leipziger Universitätsverlag. ISBN 978-3-933240-84-2.
