= Memorial to Jewish Citizens =

Memorial in Leipzig, Saxony, Germany

Coordinates: 51.34805°N 12.37160°E

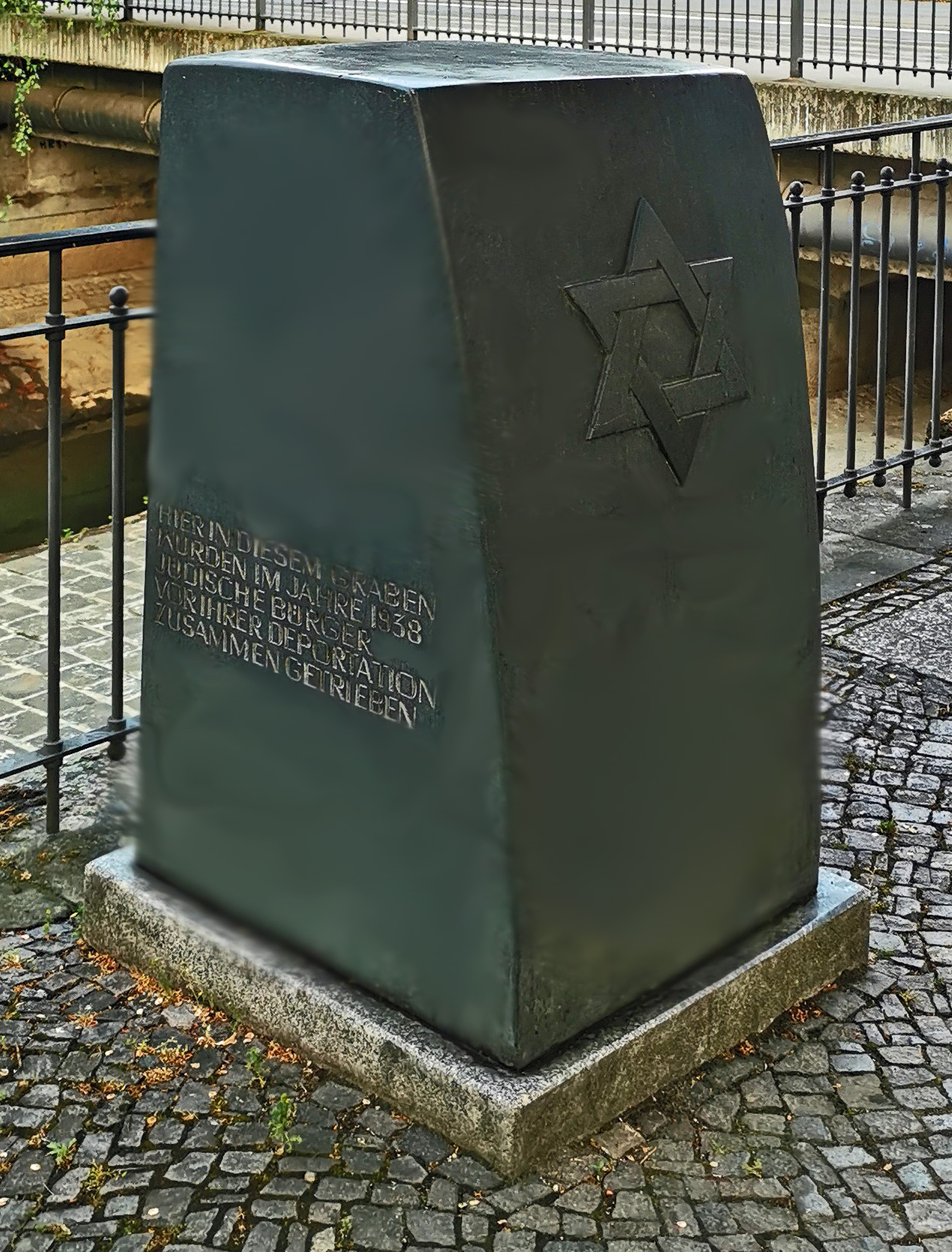
Monument to the Jews deported from Leipzig (2022)

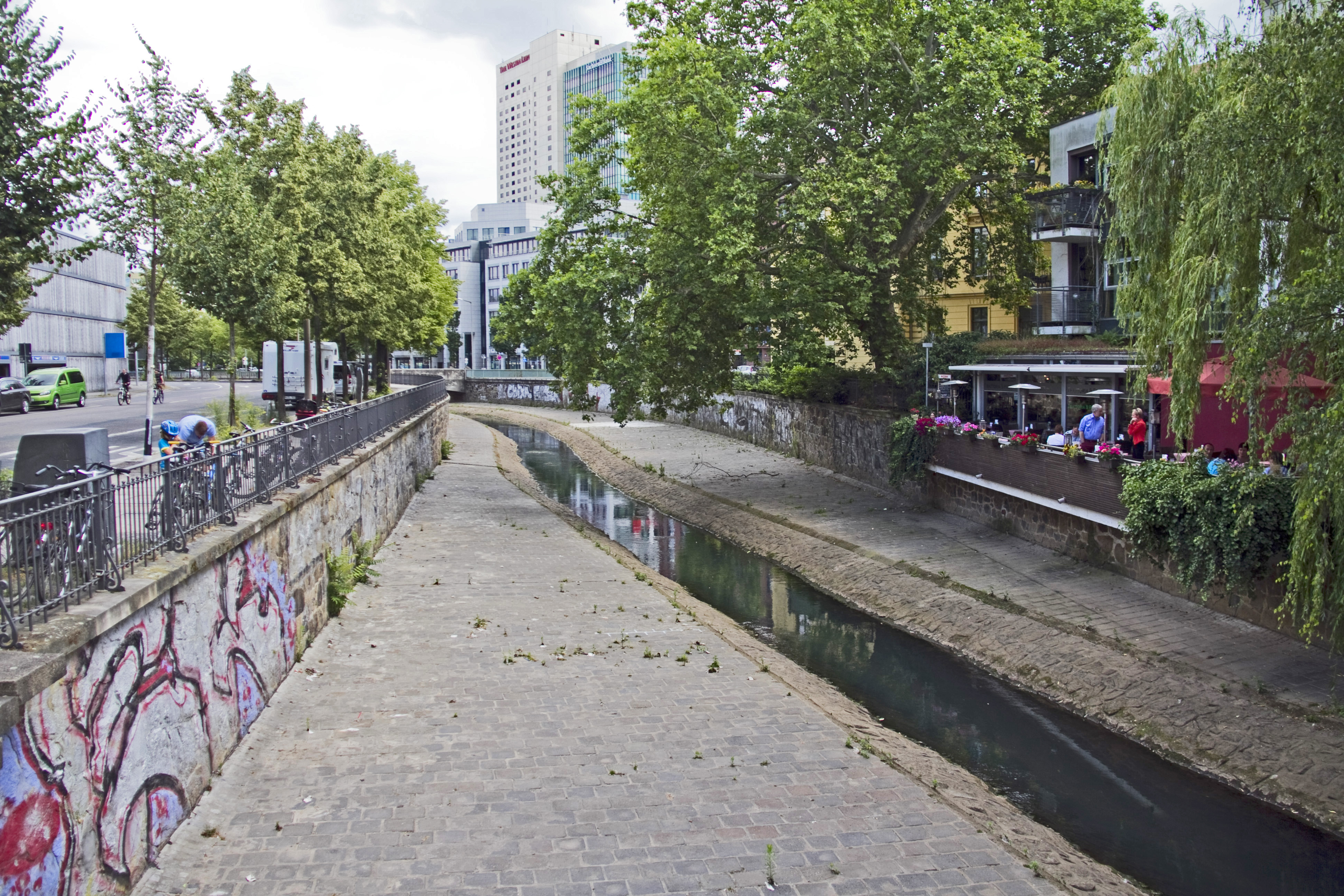
Location of the monument at the Parthe flood ditch, far left (2014)

The Memorial to Jewish Citizens in Leipzig, Germany, is a memorial stone that commemorates the deportation of Jewish citizens from Leipzig to the concentration camps after Kristallnacht in 1938. It is located at the western end of the street named Parthenstrasse next to the Parthe flood ditch, where the victims were herded together before their march to the Leipzig main train station, immediately next to the bridge of the Pfaffendorfer Strasse diagonally opposite the entrance to the Zoological Garden. It is under cultural heritage protection.

It was created on the initiative of the Ecumenical Working Group of Leipzig Churches and was set up in November 1988 to mark the 50th anniversary of the terrible event. It was designed by the Dresden sculptor Peter Makolies (b. 1936).

== Description ==
The monument is a 1.30 m (4.3 ft) tall stele with a rectangular cross section on a polished square granite slab. The rock of the stele, black Lobenstein diabase, was chosen with symbolic character, as diabase means transition in Greek. A Star of David is sculpted on the slightly curved front of the stone. The left, eastern side bears the inscription in German language:

HIER IN DIESEM GRABEN
WURDEN IM JAHRE 1938
JÜDISCHE BÜRGER
VOR IHRER DEPORTATION
ZUSAMMENGETRIEBEN.

This means in English:

HERE IN THIS TRENCH
WERE IN 1938
JEWISH CITIZENS
BEFORE THEIR DEPORTATION
DRIVEN TOGETHER.

On the opposite side, arranged vertically, is:

WO IST DEIN BRUDER?

In English:

WHERE IS YOUR BROTHER?

and below horizontally

GENESIS 4:9

== See also ==
- History of the Jews in Leipzig

== Literature ==
- Cottin, Markus (1998). Leipziger Denkmale [Memorials in Leipzig] (in German). Beucha: Sax-Verlag. p. 117. ISBN 3-930076-71-3.
- Held, Steffen (2011). "Die Leipziger Stadtverwaltung und die Deportation der Juden im NS-Staat" [Leipzig City Administration and the Deportation of the Jews in the Nazi State] (PDF). Stadtgeschichtliches Museum Leipzig (in German).
