= Naunhof =

- Town
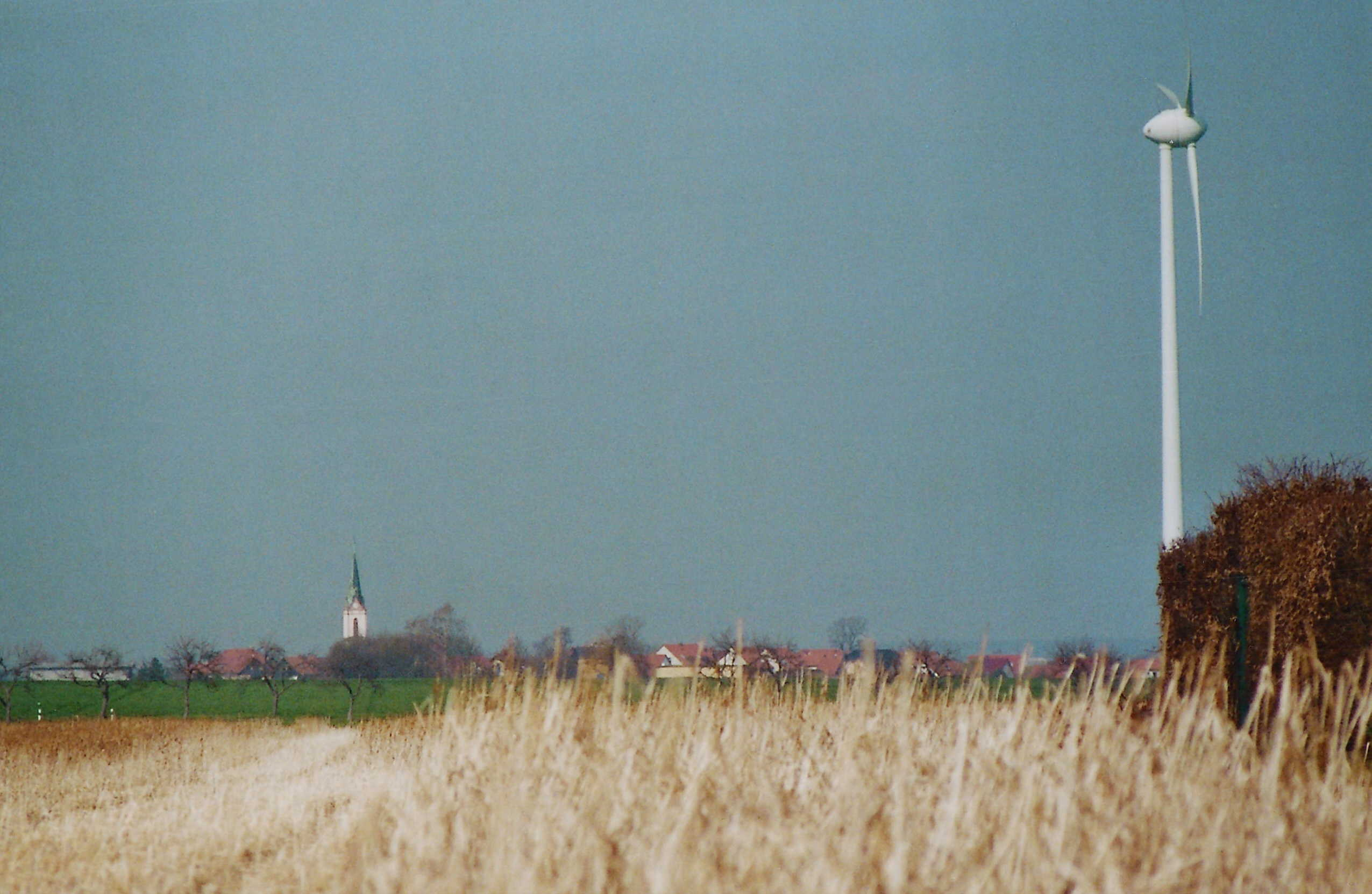

- Coat of arms

- Location of Naunhof within Leipzig district
- Interactive map of Naunhof
- Location within Germany Location within Saxony
- Coordinates: 51°16′40″N 12°35′18″E
- Country: Germany
- State: Saxony
- District: Leipzig
- Subdivisions: 7

Government
  - Mayor (2020–27): Anna-Luisa Conrad (CDU)

Area
  - Total: 39.72 km^{2} (15.34 sq mi)
- Elevation: 149 m (489 ft)

Population (2025-12-31)
  - Total: 8,709
  - Density: 219.3/km^{2} (567.9/sq mi)
- Time zone: UTC+01:00 (CET)
  - Summer (DST): UTC+02:00 (CEST)
- Postal codes: 04683
- Dialling codes: 034293
- Vehicle registration: L, BNA, GHA, GRM, MTL, WUR
- Website: www.naunhof.de

Naunhof (German pronunciation: [ˈnaʊnhoːf]) is a town in the Leipzig district, in the Free State of Saxony, Germany. It is situated on the river Parthe, 11 km northwest of Grimma, and 16 km southeast of Leipzig (centre).

== Personalities ==
- Ernst Knebel (1892-1945), German general
- Ludwig Külz (1875-1938), German tropical physician
- Paul Horst-Schulze (1876-1937), German painter, graphic artist and handicraftsman

== Coat of arms ==
In red a continuous seven zinnige silver wall with open passage and seated cornered tower with two open windows on each side and pointed roof and golden orb as a knob.
