= David H. Buffum =

American diplomat

David Harry Buffum (September 15, 1895 – May 9, 1941) was the U.S. consul in Leipzig, Germany from 1934 to 1940. After the pogrom of November 9–11, 1938 he wrote a vivid report about the horrific violence against Jewish people and property in Leipzig. Later that year he published his report as a 16-page pamphlet titled "Anti-semitic Onslaught in Germany as Seen from Leipzig." A five-page excerpt from that publication was published in the Nuremberg Trial documents in 1946, with further excerpts from that selection quoted in numerous primary source collections on German history since 1974.

== Personal life ==
According to his entry in the 1941 Register of the Department of State, Buffum was born in Dorchester, Massachusetts in 1895. He attended Phillips Exeter Academy, then Yale University from 1914 to 1917, after which he served in the U.S. Army for two years. He was a newspaper reporter from 1919 to 1923, then an appointment clerk in the U.S. consulate in the Free City of Danzig. He was then appointed as vice consul in Livorno, Italy (then known in English as Leghorn) from 1928 and Palermo, Sicily from 1929. On November 22, 1934, he was stationed at Leipzig, where he was promoted to consul on October 1, 1935. In April 1940 he was relocated to Trieste, from where he was recalled to the United States on January 25, 1941. He died in Baltimore shortly thereafter on May 9, 1941, aged 45.

== Kristallnacht testimony ==
A five-page excerpt from Buffum's self-published 16-page report about the events of Kristallnacht in Leipzig was published in 1946 in vol. VII of the Nuremberg Trial documents, Nuremberg International Military Trials: Nazi Conspiracy and Aggression. A student researcher found that portions of that excerpt were later republished in all three editions of the widely used primary source collection by Jeremy Noakes and Geoffrey Pridham, Nazism 1919–1945 in 1974, 1984 and 2000. Historians John Mendelsohn (1982), Martin Gilbert (1985), Robert G. Moeller (2010), David Niewyk and Francis Nicosia (2012), J.M. Deem (2012), and memoirist W.M. Blumenthal (2015) all include passages from Buffum's Kristallnacht report in their works. A photocopy of the original publication is held by the Harvard University library and available from the Internet Archive.
