= Kongreßhalle Leipzig =

Event building in Leipzig

Coordinates: 51.348795°N 12.371200°E

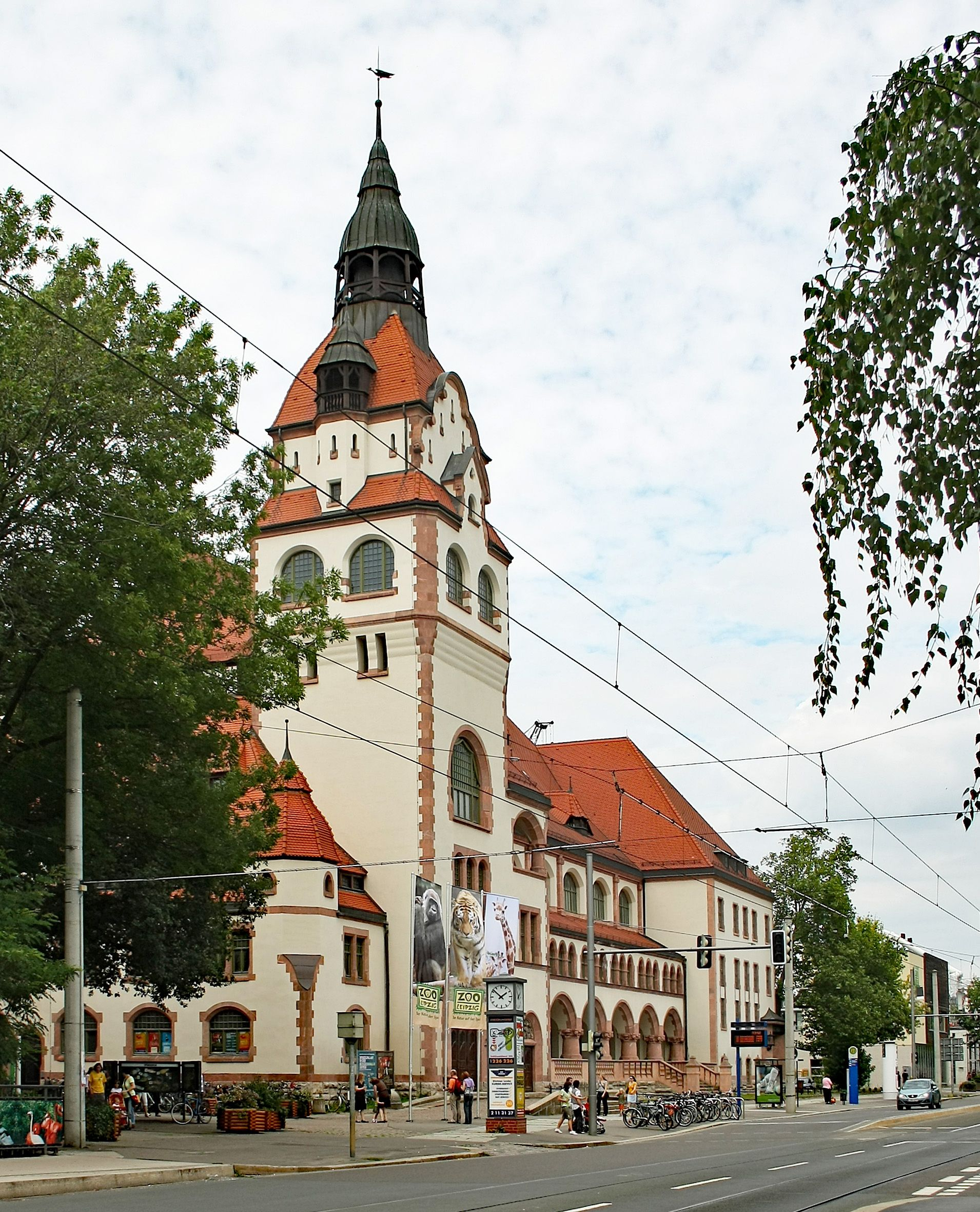
Kongreßhalle Leipzig

The Kongreßhalle Leipzig (written as a proper name after the old spelling) is an event building with several halls on Pfaffendorfer Straße in the Leipzig locality Zentrum-Nordwest directly next to the entrance to the Leipzig Zoo. Inaugurated in 1900 as the zoo's social hall, the building served as one of Leipzig's most important event venues for more than eight decades. After a long period of vacancy, it was extensively renovated and converted between 2001 and 2015.

== Building ==
The building of the Gesellschaftshaus, which has elements of Jugendstil, was designed by the Leipzig architect Heinrich Rust. With its longitudinal extension of 77 metres along the street, the wing facing the zoo and the crowning tower of 50 metres in height, the house is a dominant feature of urban development.

The house has several halls and rooms, which were named as follows at the time of its opening: "Großer Saal", "Weißer Saal" "Terrassensaal" (today Richard Wagner Hall), "Pfauensaal" (today Bach Hall), "Lortzingsaal", "Goethesaal", "Lessing- und Leibnizsaal", "Mendelssohn-Bartholdy-Zimmer" and "Basteizimmer". The ceiling in the foyer was considered one of the most important examples of Art Deco in Leipzig. The dance floor in the Great Hall was one of the largest so-called swinging dance floors in Europe, which allow for softer dancing due to a multi-layered structure equipped with cavities. The Great Hall also had an organ. A special post office was also present.

== History ==
North of the confluence of the Parthe with the then course of the Pleiße, the Folwark existed since the Middle Ages in Pfaffendorf. After the reconstruction of the estate following the Battle of Leipzig, the buildings were also used by the restaurant "Zum Pfaffendorfer Hof". In 1873, Ernst Pinkert took over this restaurant and opened his Leipzig Zoological Garden on the meadow behind it on Whit Sunday 1878. In 1899, he transformed it into a public limited company, of which he was appointed board member and director. A flurry of building activity now began, in the course of which the old estate buildings were demolished and structures erected for the zoo, including the Bürgerliches Gesellschaftshaus on Pfaffendorfer Straße, today's Congress Hall, which was initiated by Leipzig merchants. Work on the Gesellschaftshaus was originally scheduled for completion on 1 January 1900, but after construction delays the opening did not take place until 29 September 1900.

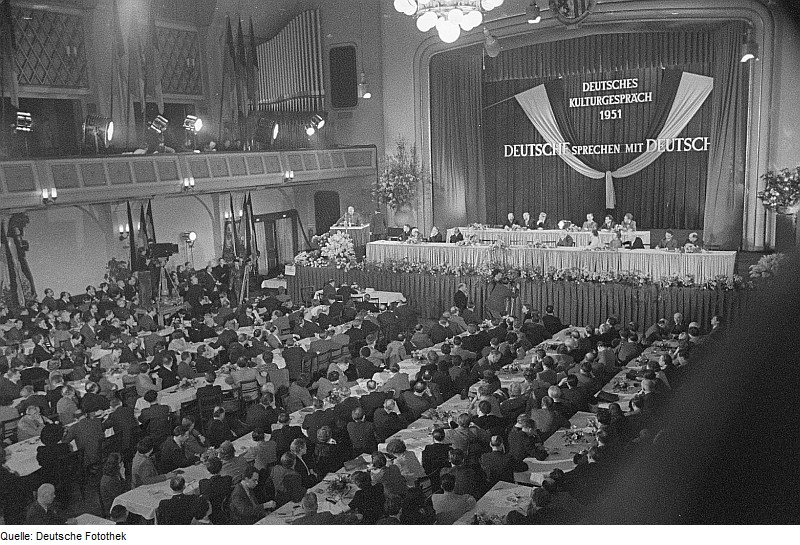
The interior of the Great Hall, which was used for congresses, sporting events and concerts. Here German-German Cultural Talk were held in 1951

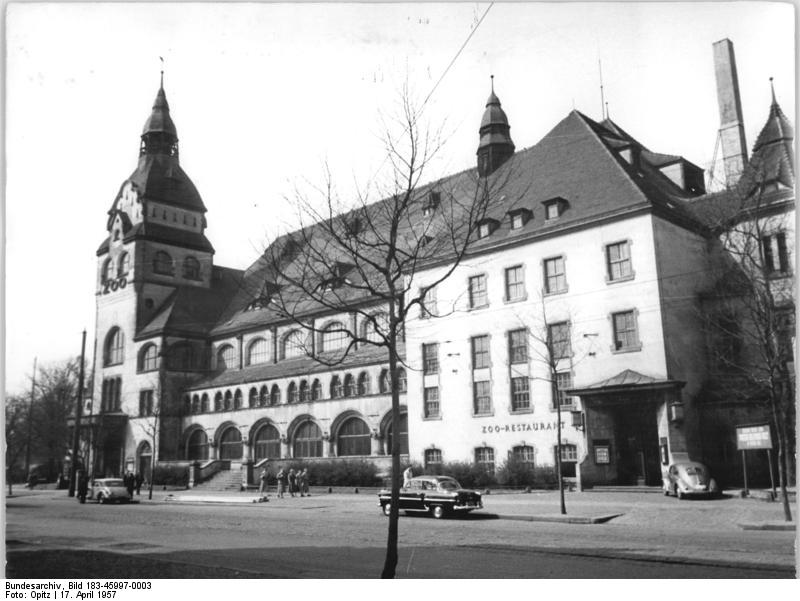
Zustand 1957

It is often claimed that the building served as a military hospital during the First World War - however, this cannot be proven and is considered rather unlikely. After the war, the house was once again a social meeting place in Leipzig. There was only minor damage during the Second World War, which was soon repaired. In 1947, the Congress Hall was reconstructed and rebuilt (widening of the tiers, lower ceiling, installation of a stage). It thus became the most important social hall in the city of Leipzig.

From 1946 until the opening of the third Gewandhaus in 1981, the concerts of the Gewandhaus Orchestra under the direction of Franz Konwitschny, Václav Neumann and Kurt Masur took place in the Great Hall. Numerous international soloists made guest appearances. From 1946 to August 1989, the Weiße Saal served as the venue for the first German-language children's theatre - the Theater der Jungen Welt.

The Congress Hall hosted events of various genres, including political congresses and sporting events in addition to those of light entertainment. For example, the opening ceremony of the Deutsche Hochschule für Körperkultur took place in 1950, the 1st German Cultural Congress in 1951, the IV. World Trade Union Congress took place in 1957, wrestling tournaments in 1959 and 1960 in honour of Werner Seelenbinder, and the Leipziger Jazztage have been held annually since 1978.

Historically significant is the protest in the Congress Hall on 20 June 1968 against the demolition of the University Church, when a poster was rolled out at the final concert of the International Johann Sebastian Bach Competition calling for its reconstruction.

In September 1988, the building was closed by the building police except for the " Weißer Saal" and was thus no longer open to the public. On 28 August 1989, there was a fire in the stage house of the White Hall and as a result, on 12 September 1989, the Congress Hall Leipzig was completely closed.

In the course of a subsequent clearing-out of the building by the city, much of the original inventory that made up the charm of the Congress Hall disappeared.

== Redevelopment 2001 to 2015 ==
First initiatives to revive the building failed. On Tag des offenen Denkmals, the Citizens' Initiative "Congress Hall Leipzig" was founded, which was able to push ahead with the renovation of the outer façade in the context of the zoo's 125th anniversary in 2003. On 23 May 2003, the Zoo Restaurant was opened in the Richard Wagner Hall. On 19 December 2006, members of the Bach Hall Project Group founded the Association "Congress Hall Leipzig" e. V. In 2007, the Krystallpalast (Leipzig) moved into the Great Hall and used it until summer 2010.

In 2009, Zoo Leipzig GmbH became the building owner and Messegesellschaft the economic operator of the Congress Hall. As part of the Konjunkturpaket II, 7.76 million euros were activated for the refurbishment in 2009. The first construction phase, to which the city contributed approx. 4.4 million euros as an investment supplement, began in 2010. In total, about 30 million euros were invested in the project, for which Leipzig Zoo acted as the building owner.

On 29 September 2010 - exactly 110 years after the opening of the Gesellschaftshaus - the foundation stone was laid. A new wing was built in the north wing of the building, which includes four new congress halls (Telemannsaal and Händelsaal on the ground floor as well as Mahlersaal and Schumannsaal on the ground floor) and the renovated neo-baroque Bachsaal. Since December 2011, three halls in the basement have been available again. Parts of the south wing with the foyer of the Großer Saal have also been renovated; this area will contain a tourist information centre in the future.

In a second construction phase, the White Hall built in 1925, once the performance venue of the Theatre of the Young World and closed since a fire in 1989, was renovated. With the addition of a Palm Room, which was built on the site of the Old Predator House, the rooms will be used as a restaurant in the future.

In a third construction phase, the renovation of the entire Congress Hall including the Great Hall in Art Nouveau style as well as four halls and two rooms on the first and first floors of the south wing took place until 2015. The architect of the renovation was Gerd Heise.

The Congress Hall was reopened on 29 May 2015 with a ceremony featuring the Thomanerchor and the Gewandhaus Quartet, which was also the start of the "1000 Years of Leipzig" festivities, followed by a civic festival. The public musical inauguration of the Great Hall will take place on 18 October 2015, providing a congress and conference centre close to the city centre with 15 halls and rooms with capacities for 10 to 1200 people. The operator of the complex is the Congress Center Leipzig of the Leipzig Trade Fair.

== Organ ==
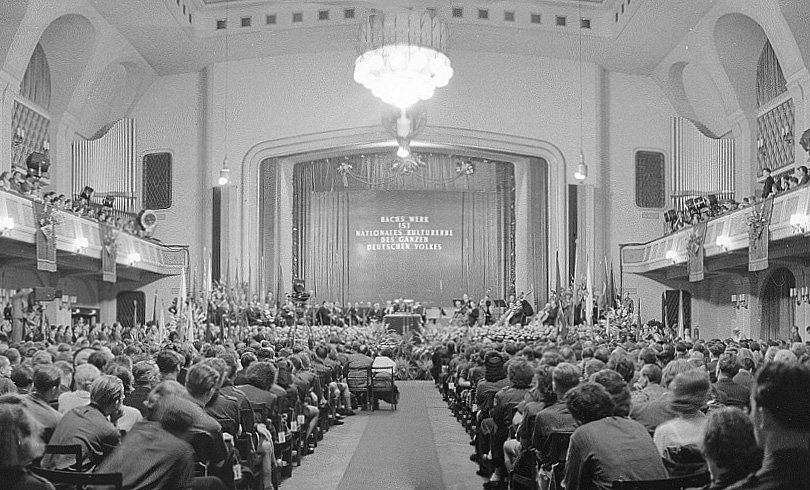
View of the Jehmlich organ (1950) installed to the left and right of the stage in 1947/1948.

As the new home of the Gewandhaus Orchestra, performances of organ works were also to be possible in the Congress Hall. On 4 June 1946, even before the reopening, the first discussions took place about the installation of a concert organ in the Great Hall. Three days later, the companies Jehmlich Orgelbau Dresden and Hermann Eule Orgelbau Bautzen were invited to submit a bid. Eule cancelled only a few days later, so that the organ building company Jehmlich took over the contract.

It was decided to build the organ in two parts with the casing arranged above the rank on both sides of the stage. For this purpose, the first left and right side windows of the hall, including skylights, had to be closed. Assembly work began in August 1947. Because of the many events taking place, the work could not proceed as planned, and the handover date scheduled for December could not be kept. The total cost of the organ was 52,103.70 ℛ︁ℳ︁. In the 14th Gewandhaus concert on 12 February 1948, the organ was played for the first time by Günther Ramin, and works by Handel, Bach and Bruckner were heard.

Due to the fact that the organ was divided between two widely separated locations in the hall, its technical construction was complicated and it was very susceptible to malfunctions. Because of the numerous dance and entertainment events that took place, the organ became dirty extremely quickly, so that as early as 1959 the once so beautiful instrument [...] fell into a catastrophic condition due to downright irresponsible neglect. It became necessary to go through and intonate the instrument elaborately before each use. For these reasons, the Congress Hall organ was only used for five concerts. It was played as a solo instrument at the Leipzig premiere of the organ concerto opus 50 by Rainer Kunad. The organ sounded for the last time on 30 October 1980 with three organ sonatas by Mozart in the Gewandhaus's 7th Entitlement Concert.

The organ disappeared after the fall of the Berlin Wall in the course of the above-mentioned clearing out; the console was discovered in a church and returned to the Congress Hall.

=== Disposition ===
I. Manual C–f^{3}
1.	Quintade	16′
2.	Großprinzipal	8′
3.	Rohrgedackt	8′
4.	Dulziana	8′
5.	Oktave	4′
6.	Blockflöte	4′
7.	Superoktave	4′
8.	Mixtur IV
9.	Sesquialtera II
10.	Quinte (aus Sesquialtera II)	2 2/3′
11.	Helltrompete	8′

II. Manual C–f^{3}
1.	Bordun	16′
2.	Sing. Gedackt	8′
3.	Flötenprinzipal	8′
4.	Gemshorn (Note: zarte Intonation)	8′
5.	Praestant	4′
6.	Rohrflöte	4′
7.	Naßat	2 2/3′
8.	Waldflöte	2′
9.	Terz	1 3/5′
10.	Glöcklein	1′
11.	Zimbel IV
12.	Clarine	4′

Pedal C–f^{1}
1.	Prinzipalbaß (Note: im Prospekt)	16′
2.	Subbaß	16′
3.	Echobaß	16′
4.	Quintbaß	10 2/3′
5.	Oktavbaß	8′
6.	Flötenbaß	8′
7.	Rohrpfeife	4′
8.	Rauschpfeife III
9.	Posaune	16′

- Koppeln
  - Normalkoppeln: II/I, I/Pedal, II/Pedal
- Spielhilfen: 3-fache freie Vorbereitung, Registercrescendo, Tutti-Auslöser, Schwelltritt für II. Manual, Gesamttremolo für alle Register des II. Manuals, Gesamtauslöser für Handregistratur

== Artists who have performed in the Congress Hall (selection) ==
(in alphabetical order)

- Salvatore Adamo
- Chris Barber
- Gilbert Bécaud
- Roy Black
- Katja Ebstein
- Juliette Gréco
- Herbert Kegel
- René Kollo
- Mireille Mathieu
- Mario del Monaco
- David Oistrach
- Anneliese Rothenberger
- Klaus Renft Combo
- Konstantin Wecker
