= Rosental =

Public park in Leipzig

Coordinates: 51°21′00″N 12°21′49″E

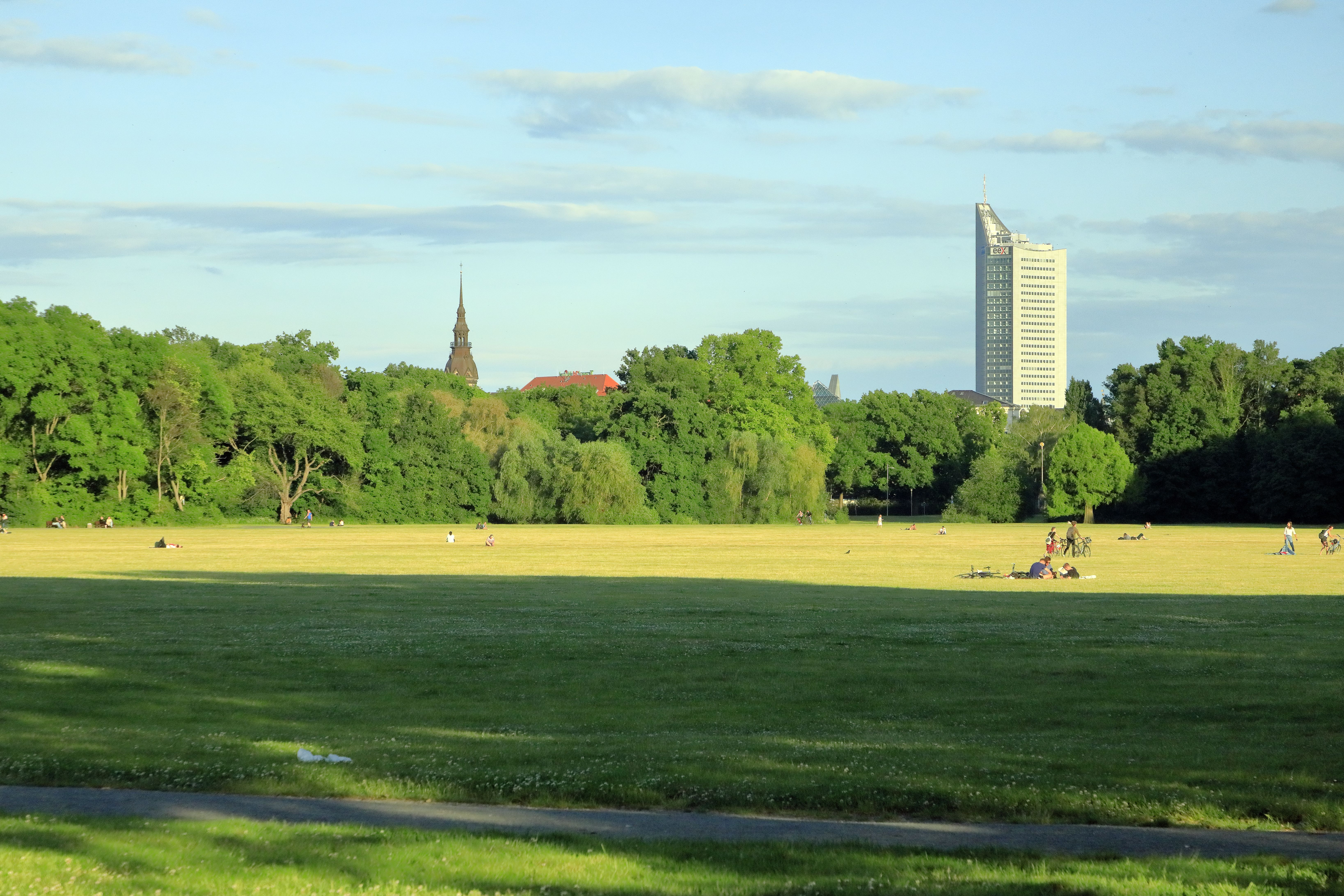
- The inner-city Leipzig landscape park "Rosental"
- Interactive map of Rosental
- Type: Urban park
- Location: Leipzig, Saxony, Germany, locality Zentrum-Nordwest
- Area: 118 ha (290 acres)
- Created: 1707
- Open: all year round

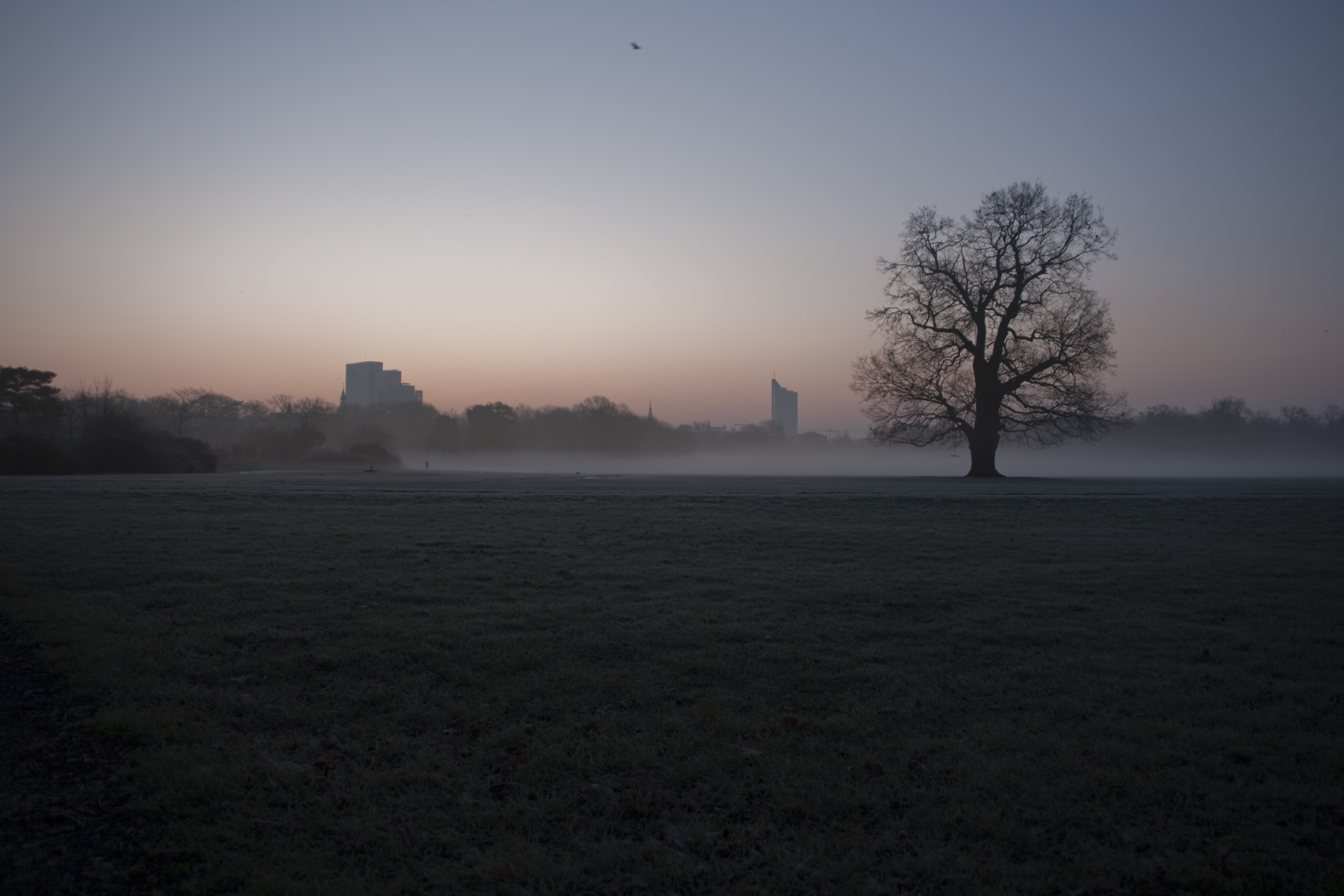
View over the Great Meadow towards the city center.

The Rosental is a 118 ha (290 acres), park-like part of the northern Leipzig floodplain forest in Leipzig, Germany. It is bordered by the Elstermühlgraben (Elster mill ditch) to the south and west, the small river Parthe to the north and the Leipzig Zoo to the east.

== History ==
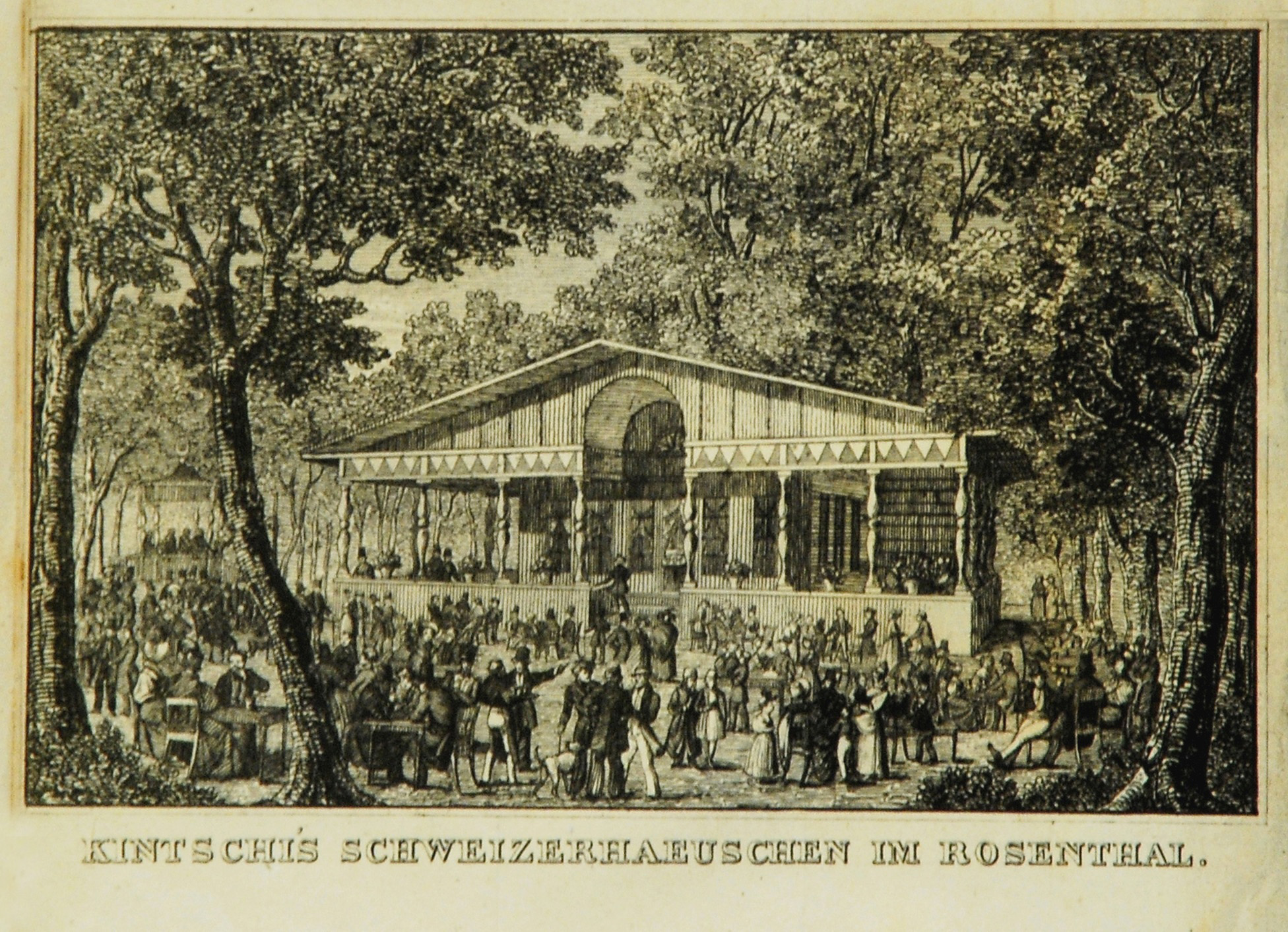
The “Schweizerhäuschen” (Swiss House) in Rosental around 1839.

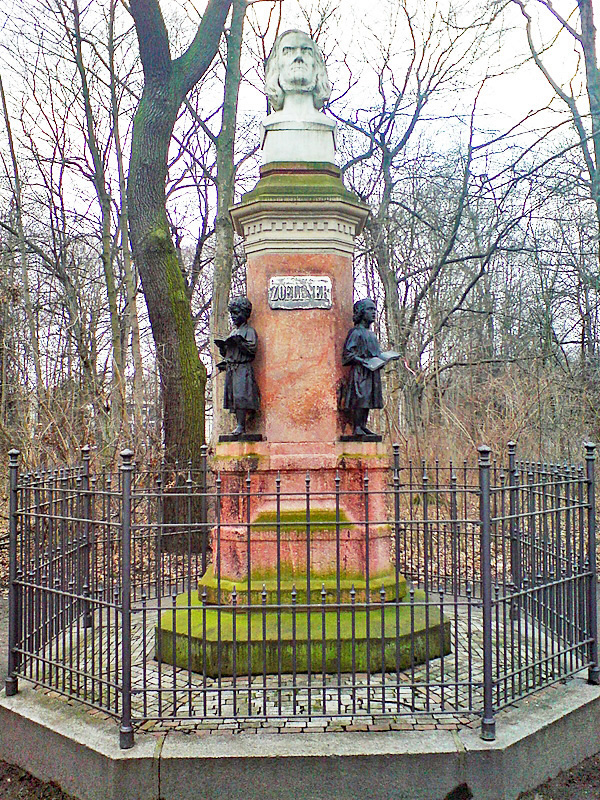
Carl Friedrich Zöllner monument by sculptor Hermann Knaur (1868)

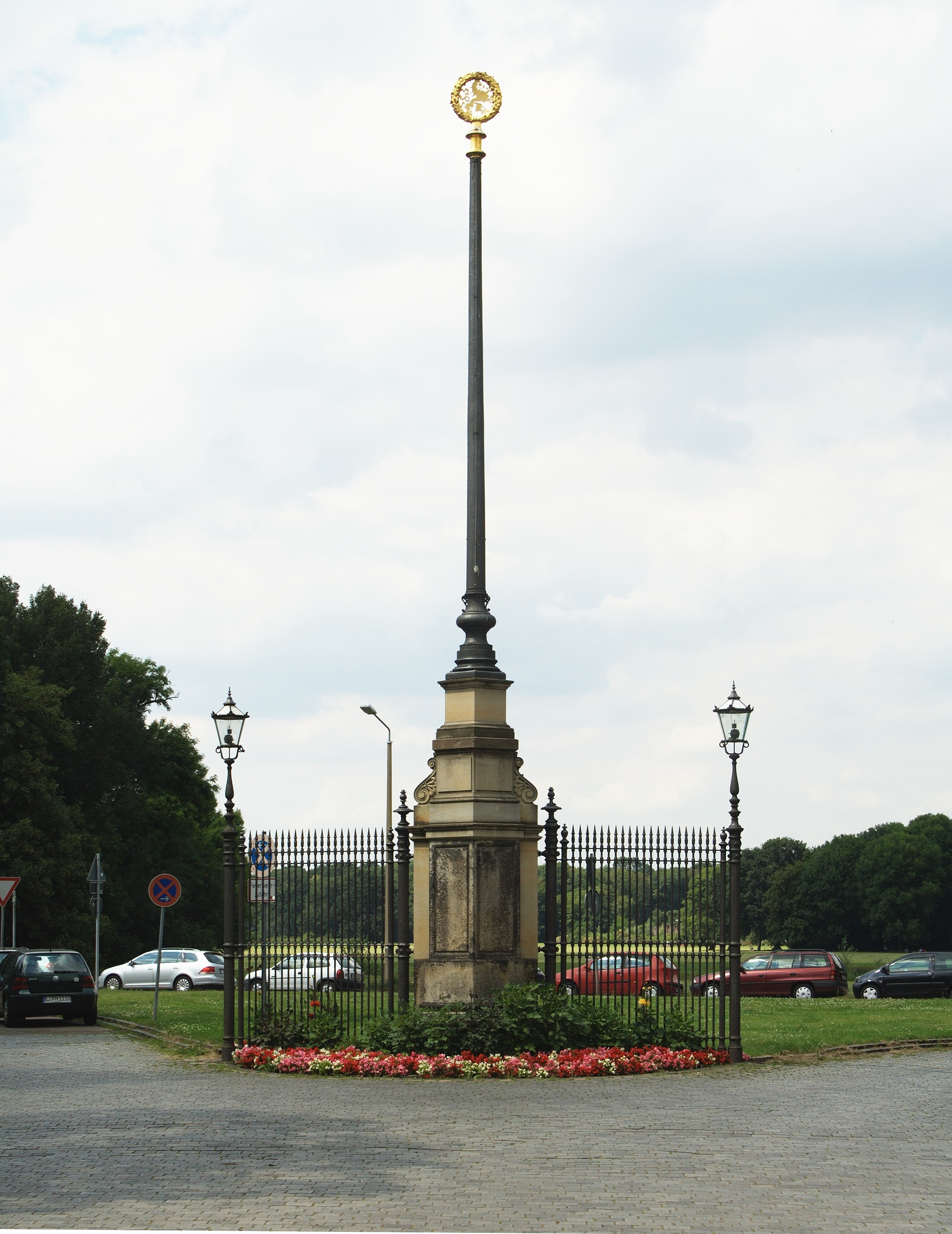
Historic entrance to the Rosental

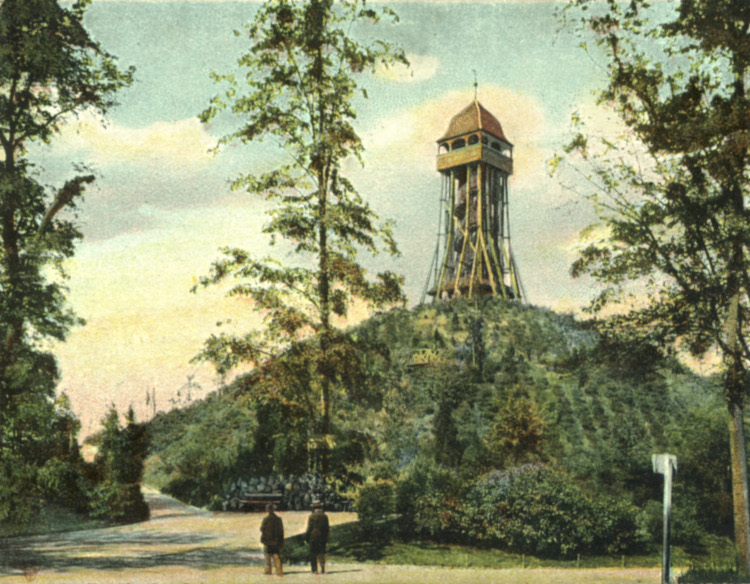
The Rosental Tower on the Rosental Hill around 1900. The tower was inaugurated on 22 June 1896.

The name Rosental was first mentioned in a document in 1318. The forest, which was owned by the Saxon electors, was sold to the Leipzig council by John George II, Elector of Saxony on 1 September 1663. As the agreed purchase price of 17,142 guilders was offset against the elector's debts to the city, the seller was left with less than 6,000 guilders. His grandson Augustus II the Strong later contested this deal and accused the Leipzig council of having fraudulently obtained the contract. The council was then forced to begin redesigning the Rosental at the end of November 1707 according to a plan by Johann Christoph von Naumann. The large meadow and thirteen radial, mostly pathless view corridors (six are still visible today) were cut into the Rosental. The corridors were aligned with interesting points in the area. At their intersection, the plan also envisaged an elaborate eleven-axis palace complex. However, since the construction was to be financed from the city of Leipzig's coffers, the council tried to prevent their construction by citing summer mosquito plagues, regular flooding and the supposed threat of gangs of robbers. In the end, only a wooden observation tower was built. However, this was used extensively by Augustus II the Strong during his stays in Leipzig.

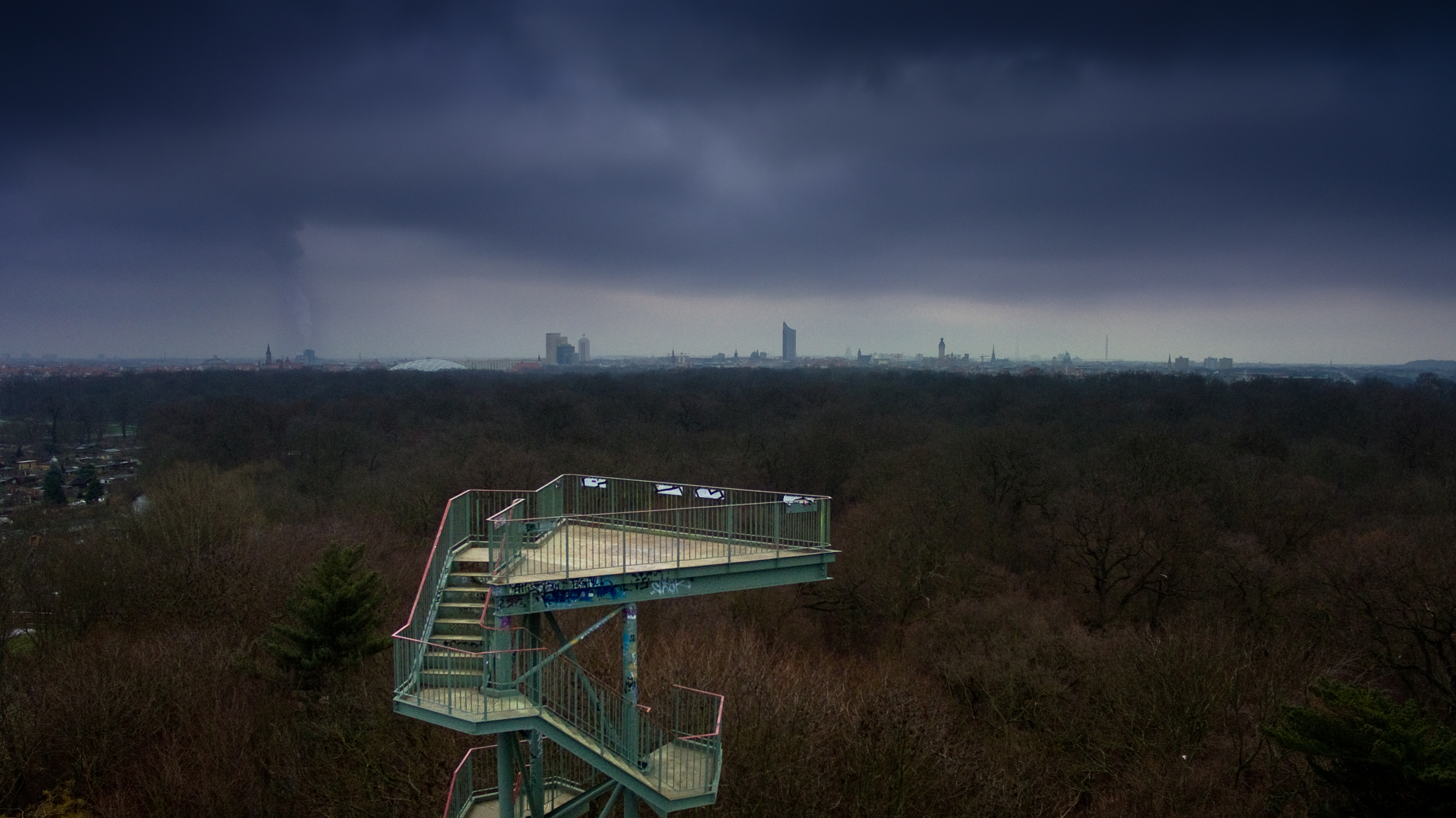
The new Rosental Tower with a view of the city centre

In 1777, at the suggestion of Hofrat Johann Gottlob Böhme, the Dammweg was built, the first walking path through the Rosental. It led from Gohlis to the Rosental Gate and was further enhanced for visitors in 1782 and 1824 with the opening of two cafés (the Schweizerhäuschen and the Café Bonorand).

The Rosental was given its current park-like design by the garden artist Rudolph Siebeck from 1837 onwards. An irregular network of paths and new plantings took away the park's strict layout.

On its eastern side, the Rosental lost a large area due to several expansions of the Leipzig Zoological Garden. However, with the last expansion and the associated completion of the so-called zoo showcase in 1976, a wide ditch between the zoo and the Rosental, an insight into the zoo's animal population and a view of the Rosental landscape for zoo visitors is now possible.

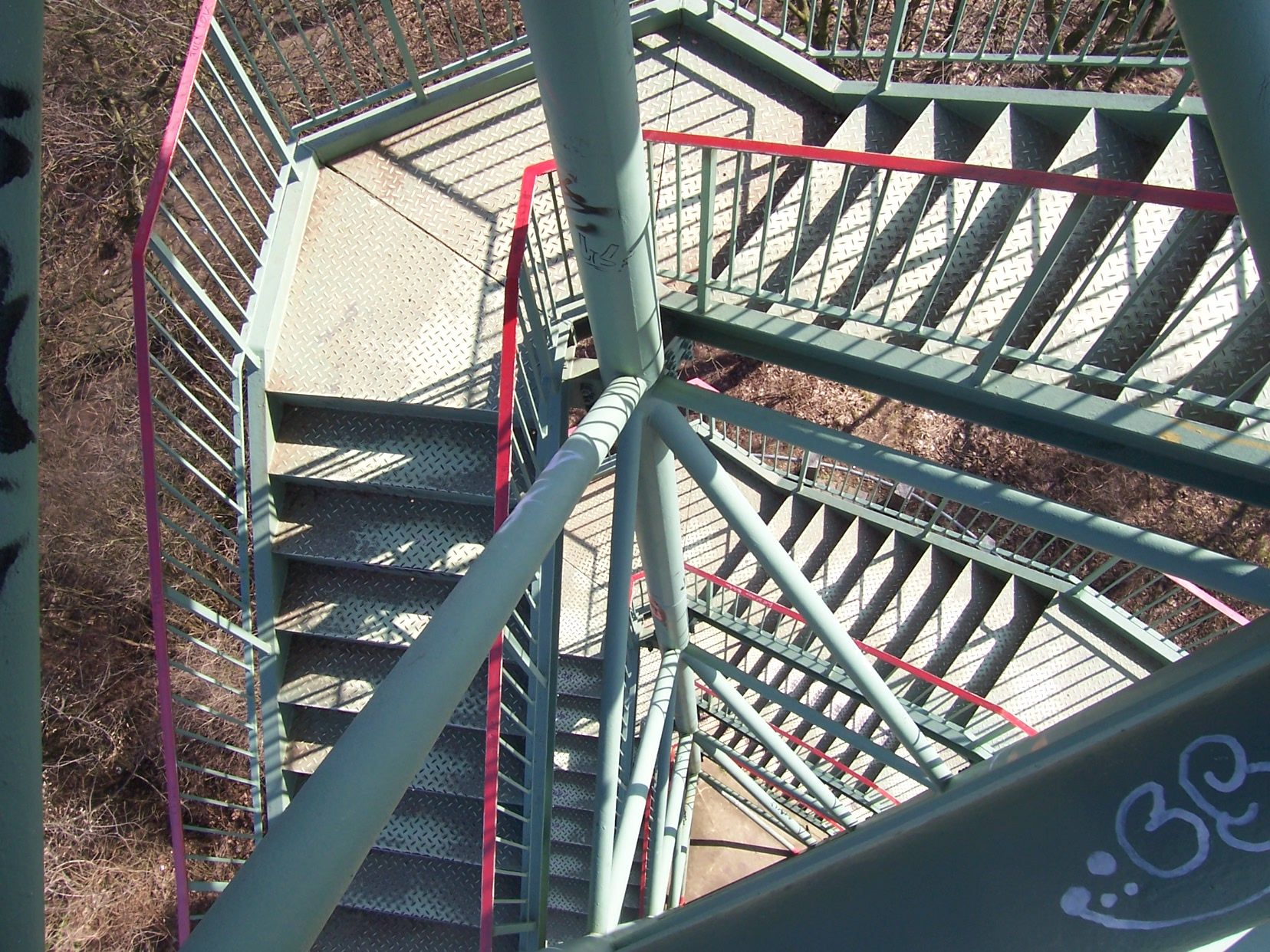
The new Rosental Tower

There is an artificial hill in the northwest of the Rosental. Between 1887 and 1896, 120,000 m^{3} (4,200,000 cu ft) (60,000 horse-drawn carts) of household waste were piled up to form the 20 m (66 ft) tall Rosental Hill ("Scherbelberg"). This was planted in 1895 and in 1896 a 15 m (49 ft) tall wooden observation tower was built on it, designed by Hugo Licht. The tower burned down completely as a result of the heavy bombing raid on 4 December 1943. Since 1975, a new 20 m (66 ft) tall observation tower made of steel has stood on this site.

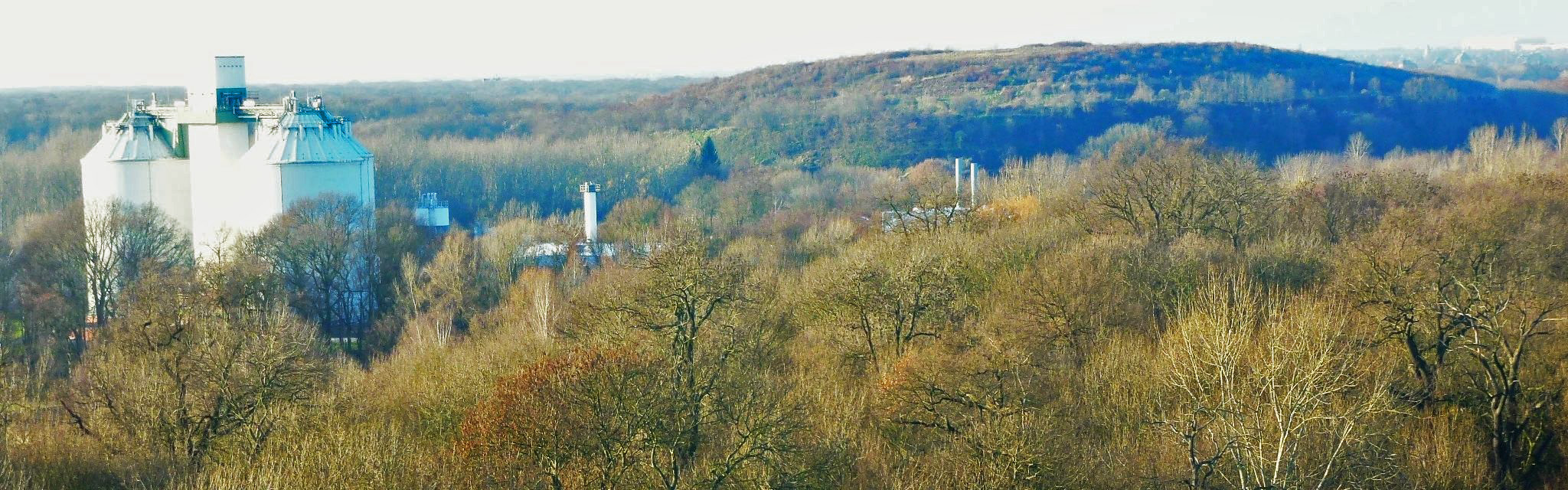
View from the Rosentalturm to the sewage treatment plant and the Nahleberg

At the northwest end of the Rosental is the Rosental sewage treatment plant of the Kommunale Wasserwerke Leipzig, the central wastewater treatment facility of the city of Leipzig.

The origin of the name Rosental is still unclear. In 1714, the chronicler Johann Jacob Vogel wrote in the Leipzig Chronicon:

“The Rosental has the name of charming, shady and fun walks, just as other fun and pleasant places bear the name of paradise, or like vineyards in Jena, on this side of the Saale river, which are called Rosenberge because of their charm.”

In the Deutsches Wörterbuch (German dictionary) of the Brothers Grimm, the origin is assumed to be a Slavic word:

"often as a place name. The famous Rosenthal near Leipzig (see ALBRECHT 193b), however, a city forest, has nothing to do with rose, but is possibly a folk etymological distortion of the Slavic rozdot, hollow, deep and wide lowland."

— Brothers Grimm

== Trivia ==
Gottfried Wilhelm Leibniz, a philosopher and polymath from Leipzig, reports that in the 1660s, when he was about fifteen years old, he experienced a first turning point in his philosophical development while taking walks in the Rosental: At that time, he had (provisionally) decided to abandon the idea of substantial form, which was central to the traditional Aristotelian worldview.

Etant emancipé des Ecoles Triviales, je tombay sur les modernes, et je me souviens que je me promenay seul dans un boscage aupres de Leipzig, appellé le Rosendal, à l’âge de 15 ans, pour delibérer si je garderois les Formes Substantielles. Enfin le Mechanisme prevalut et me porta à m’appliquer aux Mathematiques.

"When I had grown out of the trivial school, I came across the modern [philosophers], and I remember that at the age of 15 I was wandering alone through a grove near Leipzig, called Rosendal, to decide whether I wanted to keep the Substantial Forms. In the end, mechanism won out and led me to study mathematics."

— Gottfried Wilhelm Leibniz, letter to Nicolas François Rémond, 10. January 1714

One of the access roads to the Rosental is today the Leibnizstrasse, which continues inside the park as Leibnizweg.

== Event ==
Since 2009, the annual open-air-concerts Klassik airleben of the Leipzig Gewandhaus Orchestra on the great meadow in the Rosental park attracted ten thousands of listeners every year.

== Bibliography ==
- Friedrich Hofmann: Das Leipziger Rosenthal. In: Die Gartenlaube. Heft 29, 1884, S. 484, 485, 487
- Hocquél, Wolfgang (2023). Architekturführer Leipzig. Von der Romanik bis zur Gegenwart (in German). Leipzig: Passage-Verlag. pp. 166–168. ISBN 978-3-95415-128-8.
