= Kristallnacht in Leipzig =

1938 attacks on the Leipzig Jewish communities

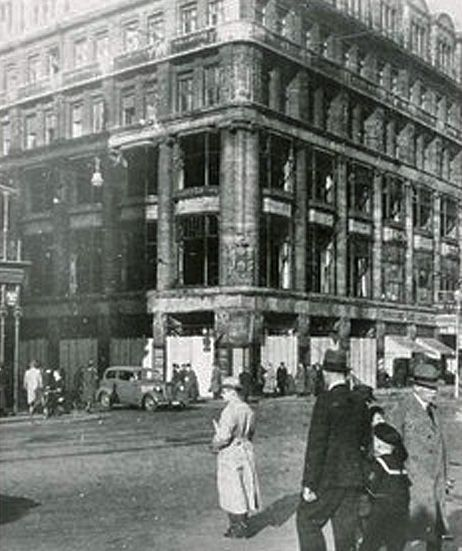
A destroyed department store in Leipzig after Kristallnacht

In Leipzig, as in other German cities, Jews and Jewish institutions suffered from attacks during the events called Kristallnacht, from November 9–10, 1938. Kristallnacht took its name because of all of the shattered glass from destroyed synagogues, Jewish-owned stores, Jewish-owned homes, schools, and Jewish-owned artifacts. The violence and destruction was carried out by members of the Sturmabteilung (SA), Schutzstaffel (SS), Gestapo, as well as German civilians. German and Nazi officials, along with standard civilians, watched as Jewish property in Leipzig turned to ash. The pogrom affected Jewish men, women, and children in Leipzig and other parts of Germany. There were more foreign-born Jews present in Leipzig than the majority of cities in Germany, and this made conditions for Leipzig Jews worse. Harsh conditions towards Jews in Leipzig began earlier than Kristallnacht because of this, and made Kristallnacht especially harmful. Kristallnacht destroyed much of the Jewish life in Leipzig. The events of Kristallnacht in Leipzig were described by United States Consul David H. Buffum, who reported what he saw to the State Department and published his 16-page report, Anti-semitic Onslaught in Germany as Seen from Leipzig, shortly after the events. A five-page excerpt from his report was published in the Nuremberg Trial documents and was subsequently quoted at length in several English-language source collections on German history.

== Destruction by fire ==
In the early morning of November 9, 1938, Nazi party Kreisleiter, Ernst Wettengel, commanded the Leipzig SA to instigate a pogrom ordered by the Nazi national party. By 3:51 am that day, SA members dressed in regular clothes, had put the Gemeinde synagogue in the town of Gottschedstraße in flames.

Still in the morning, the Ez-Chaim synagogue, the Bamberger and Hertz department store, the Ury's department store, the Höhere Israelitische Schule, and the chapel at the Jewish cemetery were all defiled in flames. The Leipzig fire department listed the causes of all the fires to be "unknown", and only attempted to prevent the spreading of the fires in order to protect gentile property. The Nazi officials ordered the fire department and police to only aim to protect gentile property.

In the afternoon, two Jewish cafes were attacked, but no one was injured because they were tipped off by circulating rumors.

At night, the buildings on the land of the new Jewish cemetery in Delitzscher Landstraße were set on fire. Three synagogues in Leipzig suffered damage from incendiary bombs. All of the sacred artifacts and records were desecrated, and in many cases thrown onto the street to be burned. The living quarters were completely destroyed, and the large and small cemetery halls were burnt down. Black flames were one of the biggest attractions for baffled crowds in Leipzig. While the loss of goods was substantial, it was second to the destruction of property.

Many Jews were forced to clean up the damage from the burnt buildings.

== Destruction by hand ==
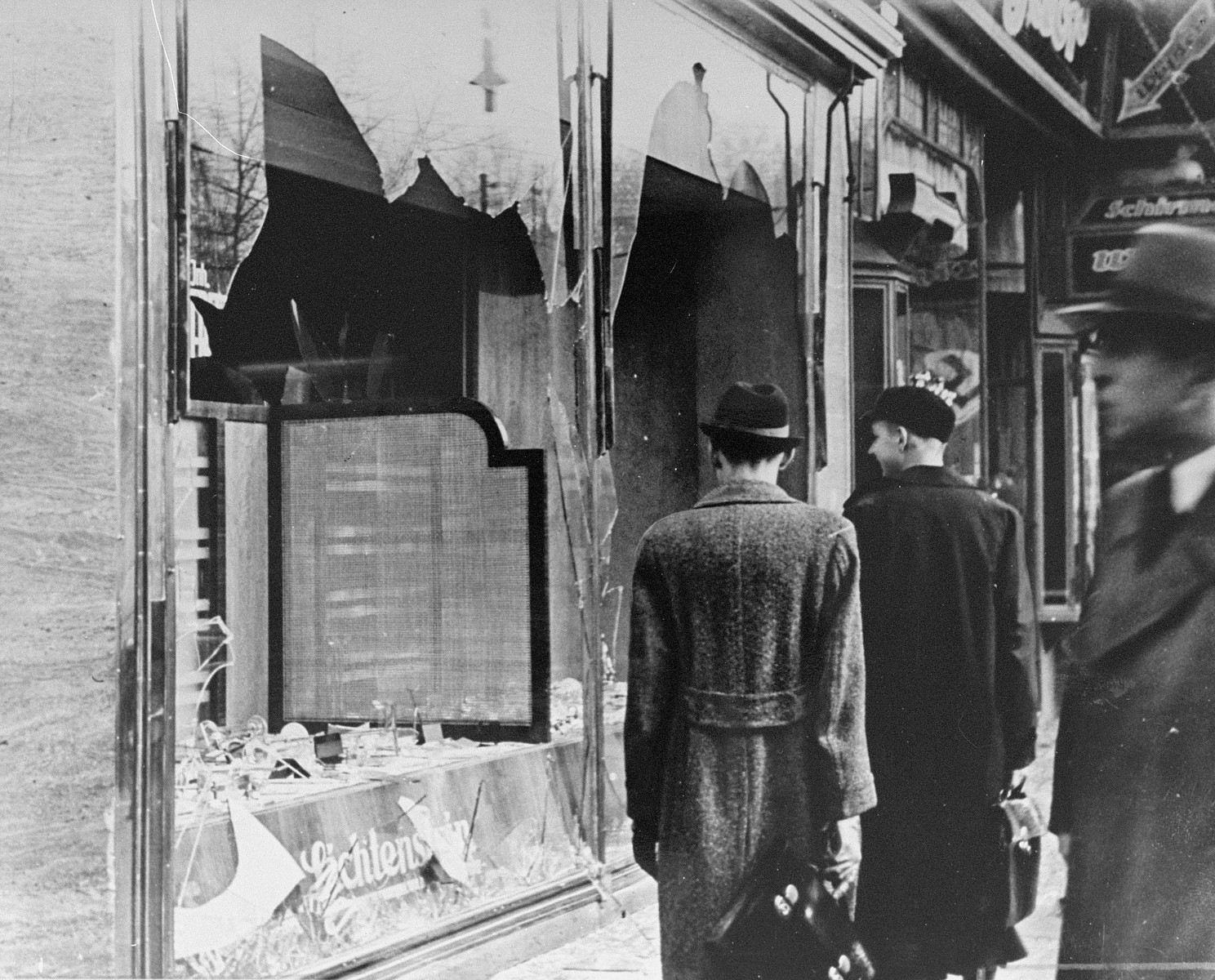
Shattered storefront of a Jewish-owned shop in Berlin destroyed during Kristallnacht

Partakers in the pogrom smashed Jewish shop windows by the hundreds. Jewish homes and synagogues were also torn apart in search of valuables, and so Nazis could achieve the joy of ruining a Jew's home. Raiders of synagogues took files and scrolls, silver shields from the Torah, and some bells and coins. Families reported the loss of jewelry, silver, decorations, furniture, and cash from their homes. In one of the Jewish sections of Leipzig, and eighteen-year-old boy was thrown from his own three-story apartment. He landed on a street filled with burning furniture from his and his neighbors’ apartments, and both of his legs broke. A Jewish family's dog was also thrown from a four-story apartment, and broke its spine. The Nazi officers disinterred ten corpses at the Jewish cemetery in Delitzscher, and left them unburied while arresting the gravediggers and cemetery attendants. During the first night of Kristallnacht, 193 businesses, 34 private homes, 3 synagogues, 4 smaller temples, the cemetery chapel, and the Ariowitsch old age home were destroyed. The damage to Leipzig cost several million Reichsmarks.

== Arrests ==
Nazi propaganda and antisemitic acts became much more frequent and severe during and after Kristallnacht.

Arrests were common. They began early in the morning of the ninth. Arrests were carried out by officers of the Gestapo and/or the Kriminalpolizei. These groups collaborated with the SA and SS, but mobs of gentiles in Leipzig also dragged Jewish men out of their homes and brought them to the police. Rioters would split into small groups and march through the neighborhoods, banging on the doors of Jewish homes shouting "Juden heraus!" ("Get out here, Jews!"), and "Raus ihr Judenschweine!" ("Out, you Jewish pigs!"). They broke down many doors of homes and dragged Jews out if they did not act promptly to the commands. They then proceeded to violate the Jews on the streets. They did this very early in the morning or late at night during both days of Kristallnacht.

Three Aryan professors of the University of Jena were arrested and brought to concentration camps because they voiced disapproval of the occurring events.

German Jews between the ages of sixteen and sixty, as well as Jewish men without citizenship, were taken to concentration camps in Germany. There were several thousands of these arrests.

=== Torture ===
Of the first people arrested that day, some were taken to the court prison and some to the local homeless shelter. A work lieutenant tortured those at the homeless shelter. They were forced to stand the entire time and set up a long-distance obstacle course in the hall. Even the elderly men that had been arrested were forced to partake, but those evidently unable to complete the course had a different task. They were ordered to form a circle and sing a lullaby that went like: "Do you know how many stars there are?". Men were verbally abused and called pimps, fraudsters, talmud, crooks, and others. The SS men would try to make fun and have a conversation with prisoners, and every silent reply of a prisoner led to being hit by a rifle butt. Almost all prisoners bled. Others arrested in Leipzig during Kristallnacht would be told to go to a curved tunnel in the prison and line up, and then ordered by SS men to perform military exercises; all while being beaten, verbally abused, and having razors thrown behind them. In the Zoo district of Leipzig, people were driven into the walled riverbed of the Parthe and held there for hours. The prisoners were tightly packed together in the river. Some of these prisoners were permitted to go back to their homes later in the day, but most were transferred to a concentration camp. Another group of prisoners were forced to walk to a concentration camp on a path for fourteen hours without food. Once they got to the camp, conditions were miserable. The water was impotable. A makeshift river was established for water, but only the dying or the mentally ill would go to drink from it. The SS set up an outhouse at the concentration camps, but it was simply a pit with a couple of bars placed over it. Several drowned in the outhouses by either falling in or being pushed in by SS members. In the Buchenwald concentration camp there were 12,000 people from different areas of Germany who had been arrested on the first day of Kristallnacht. One thousand of these prisoners were from Leipzig. In a group reported to have 250 prisoners, 26 during Kristallnacht, 17 due to the cold.

== Women and children ==
Throughout Kristallnacht in Leipzig, women and children were not targeted for arrest like military-aged Jewish men, but they were affected. SS guards and Nazi storm troopers raided Jewish homes and brutalized the women and children present. In the town of Eutritzsch in Leipzig, women were the first to be taken from their homes on the first day of Kristallnacht. Later they were reunited with the men in a public square. They were stripped of their belongings, but released later that day. Many women and children were deported from Leipzig. Many of the younger children died from the cold and poor nutrition while being transferred.

== Aftermath ==
=== Post November 10th, 1938 ===
The effects of Kristallnacht persisted after November 10. Arrests of German Jewish men between ages sixteen and sixty and Jewish men without citizenship continued. Many Jews left Leipzig completely. Those who stayed faced many challenges. With their homes destroyed, many were forced to find a new place to live. Men continued to be arrested, and in order to avoid being targeted, families split and lived separately with gentile friends and neighbors. Many Jews were fired from their jobs at "Aryan" institutions, and with so many Jewish institutions destroyed it became extremely difficult to find work. This problem was especially acute for Jewish men, who were unable to find the same opportunities still available to women. For example, women could still find work as teachers in Jewish schools, social workers, nurses, and clerical workers for Jewish communities and ghettos.

=== Revival ===
Although in the post World War Two era a modest Jewish cultural revival in Leipzig occurred, the Jewish community there never regained its pre-Kristallnacht vitality.

== Bibliography ==
- Kaplan, Marion A. Between dignity and despair: Jewish life in Nazi Germany. Oxford University Press, 1998. pp. 122–126
- Noakes, Jeremy. Documents on Nazism, 1919-1945. Jonathan Cape Ltd, 1974. pp. 473–475
- Willingham II, Robert Allen. Jews in Leipzig: Nationality and Community in the 20th Century. The University of Texas at Austin, 2005. pp. 97–115
- Jon Gunnar Mølstre Simonsen. Perfect Targets—Antisemitism and Eastern Jews in Leipzig, 1919–1923. Leo Baeck Institute Yearbook 51, 2006. pp. 81
- The Wiener Library: Pogrom - November 1938 : Testimonies from 'Kristallnacht' : Overview. Testimonies: B.30, B.193, B.326.
- Reiss, Elsa. 1938 Bericht ueber Kristallnacht. Leo Baeck institute, 1986
- Katz, David. In memory of my parents. Auschwitz 1942 Holocaust Teacher Resource Center
- Rabinbach, Anson, and Gilman, Sander L. The Third Reich Sourcebook. Berkeley.University of California Press, 2013. pp. 96, 231–233.
- Gilbert, Martin. Kristallnacht : prelude to destruction. First Harper Perennial edition, 2007
- Fitzgerald, Stephanie. Kristallnacht, the night of broken glass : igniting the Nazi War against Jews. Compass Point Books, 2008
- Steinweis, Alan E. Kristallnacht 1938. Harvard University Press, 2009
- Jaffe, Maayan. Kristallnacht. Baltimore Jewish Times, November 8, 2013. pp. 20–23.
