= Parthe =

River in Germany

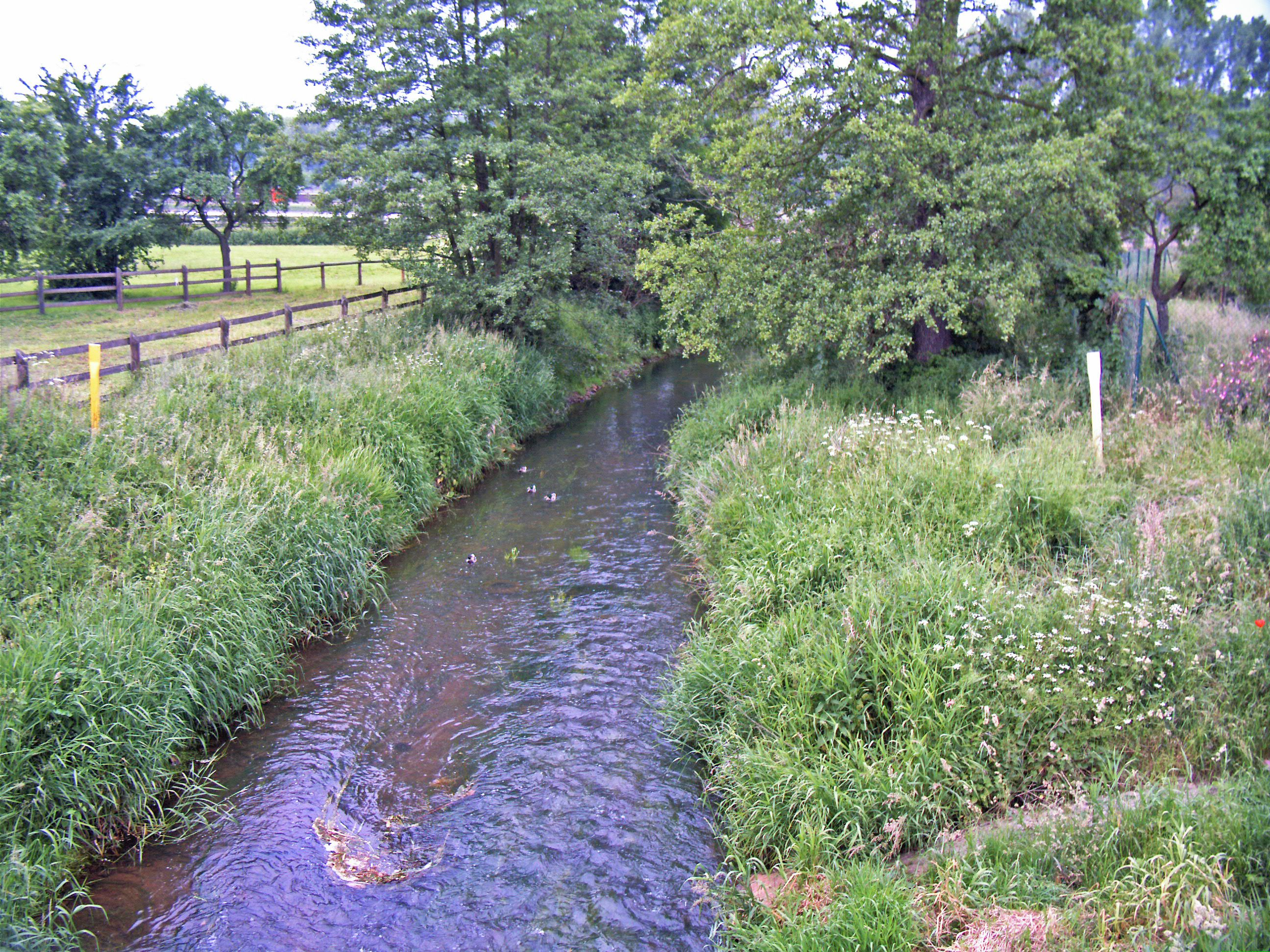

Location
- Country: Germany

Physical characteristics
- Source
  - location: Saxony
- Mouth
  - location: White Elster
  - coordinates: 51°21′39″N 12°20′32″E
- Length: 60 km (37 mi)

Basin features
- Progression: White Elster→ Saale→ Elbe→ North Sea

The Parthe (German pronunciation: [ˈpaʁtə]) is a river in Saxony, Germany, right tributary of the White Elster. Its total length is 60 km (37 mi). The Parthe originates in northern Saxony, between Colditz and Bad Lausick. It flows northwest through Parthenstein, Naunhof, Borsdorf and Taucha before entering the city of Leipzig. The Parthe traverses the Leipzig Zoological Garden and touches the Rosental park before joining the White Elster in the Zentrum-Nordwest locality.

== Course ==
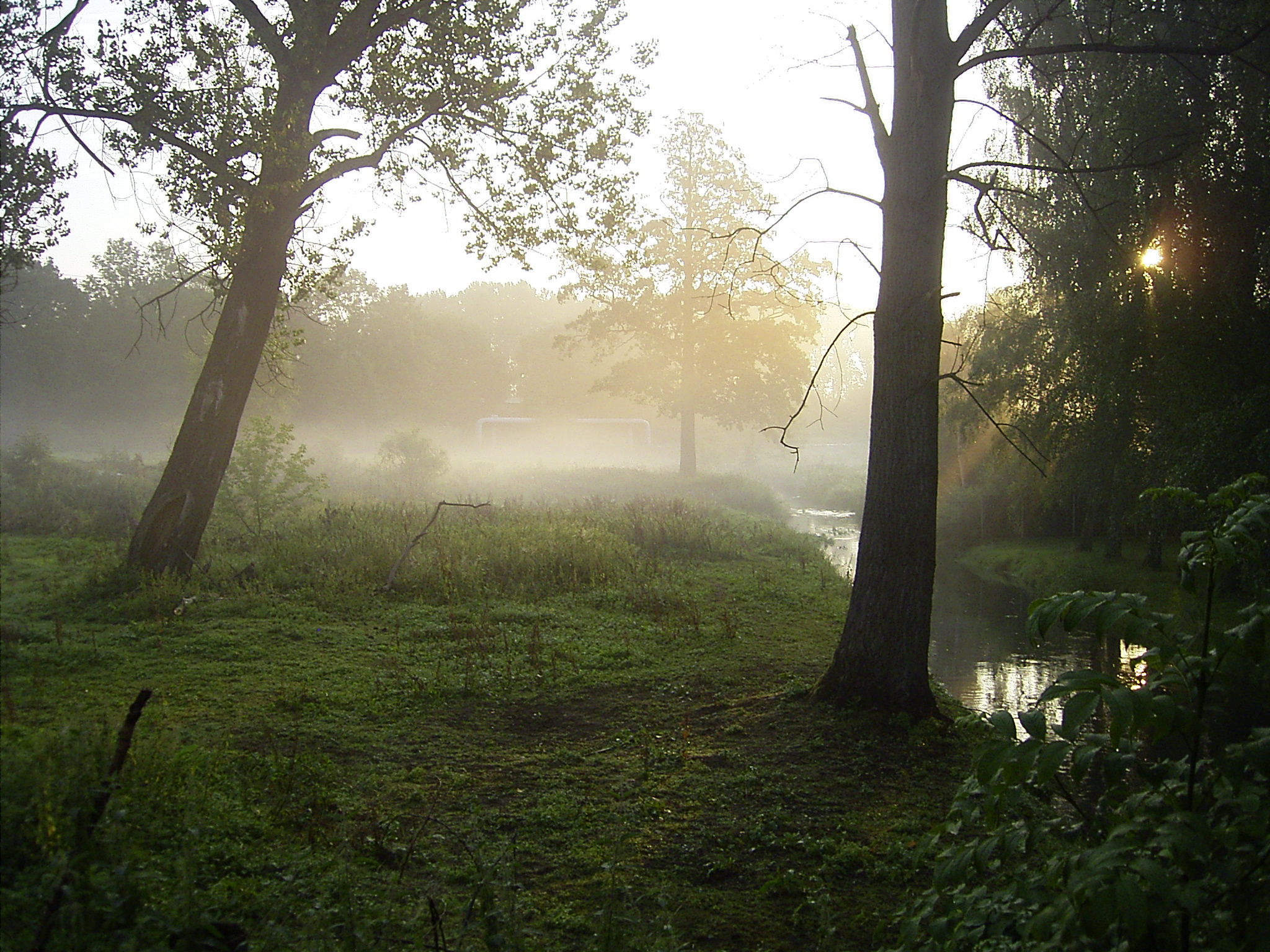
The Parthe in Leipzig

On its course through the Leipzig Bay (Leipziger Tieflandsbucht), the Parthe flows through the regions and towns of Großbardau, Parthenstein, Naunhof, Beucha, Borsdorf, Panitzsch, Taucha and Leipzig. Into the Parthe flow, amongst others, the Gladegraben, the Faule Parthe, the Todgraben, the Mittelgraben, the Grenzgraben, the Threne, the Zauchgraben, the Kittelgraben, the Wachtelbach, the Lösegraben, the Staditzbach, the Hasengraben and the Rüdgengraben. Over the years numerous straightenings and canalisations have had an effect on the river. In Leipzig's Nordvorstadt the Parthe flows in a walled river bed.

== Name ==
Amongst others, the region Parthenstein and the motorway junction Parthenaue (the merging of the A 38 into the A 14 motorway) are called after the river.

== Flooding 2002 ==
During the 100-year flood of the Elbe in 2002, the Parthe also broke its banks. This led to damage in villages and towns such as Kleinbardau and Großbardau.

== Recreation and Nature ==
The 51-kilometer (32 mi) long Parthe-Mulde-cycling route from Grimma via Naunhof, Borsdorf and Taucha to Leipzig runs alongside the Parthe for long stretches. It is part of network of cycling routes, which run from Leipzig to the Freiberger Mulde as well as to the river Elbe.

In Taucha and Abtnaundorf (a district of Leipzig) the Parthe flows through parks. Large sections of the river's course are designated as the "Nature reserve Parthenaue - Machern".

== See also ==
- Memorial to Jewish Citizens

The memorial remembers that on 10 november 1938 jewish people were driven into the walled riverbed of the Parthe in the Leipzig zoo district and held there for hours.
