= Max Klinger =

German artist (1857–1920)

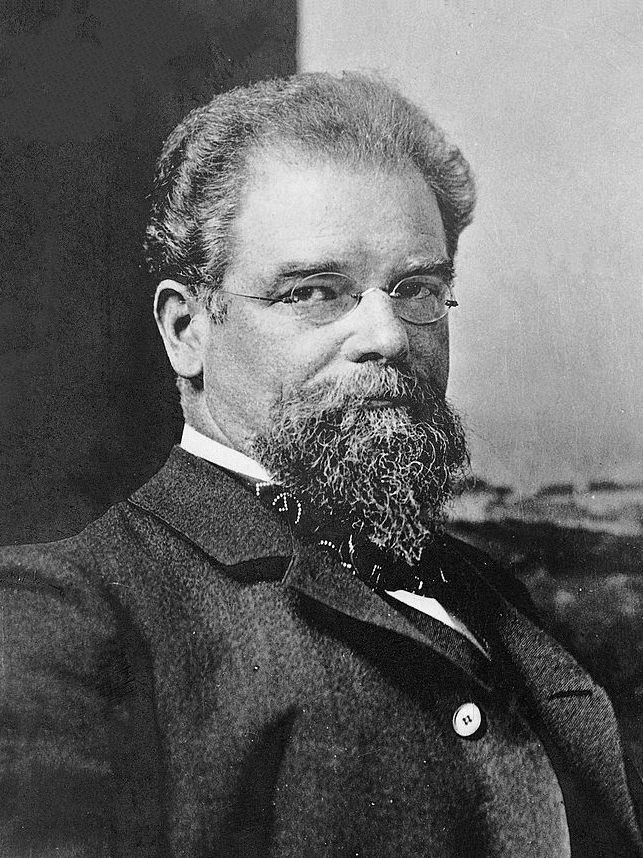
- Born: 18 February 1857; Leipzig, Kingdom of Saxony
- Died: 5 July 1920 (aged 63); Naumburg, Germany
- Known for: Printmaking, painting, sculpture
- Notable work: Paraphrase über den Fund eines Handschuhs, Beethoven, The Prime of Greece
- Movement: Symbolism, Vienna Secession, Jugendstil, Art Nouveau.

Max Klinger (18 February 1857 – 5 July 1920) was a German artist who produced significant work in painting, sculpture, prints and graphics, as well as writing a treatise articulating his ideas on art and the role of graphic arts and printmaking in relation to painting. He is associated with symbolism, the Vienna Secession, and Jugendstil (Youth Style), the German manifestation of Art Nouveau. He is best known today for his many prints, particularly a series entitled Paraphrase on the Finding of a Glove and his monumental sculptural installation in homage to Beethoven at the Vienna Secession in 1902.

== Life ==
Klinger was born in Leipzig, Kingdom of Saxony to a wealthy and prominent family. He enrolled in the Academy of Fine Arts in Karlsruhe in 1874 where he was a pupil of Karl (or Carl) Gussow. When Gussow left Karlsruhe to become the Director of the Academy of Fine Arts in Berlin, Klinger moved to Berlin as well to complete his studies there. Klinger shared a studio with Christian Krohg and the two had a mutual admiration for French naturalist authors like Émile Zola and Gustave Flaubert, who explored the shadowy aspects of urban life and the hypocrisy of society and the bourgeoisie in their novels. At that time realism was the prevailing style in Germany and Arnold Böcklin was one of the few artist active there that Klinger felt a close affinity to. Klinger graduated from the academy in 1877. He was drawn to and studied the etchings and prints of many masters that were more aligned with his sensibilities including Dürer, Rembrandt, Goya, Runge, Menzel, and Rops. He began an apprenticeship studying engraving under Hermann Sagert and soon became a skilled and imaginative engraver in his own right. Klinger visited Brussels for a time in 1879, and the following year he spent time in Munich. He was achieving some notoriety with his pen and ink drawings and prints when in 1881 he published two sets of etchings, including Paraphrase on the Finding of a Glove, which was an immediate success and established his reputation.

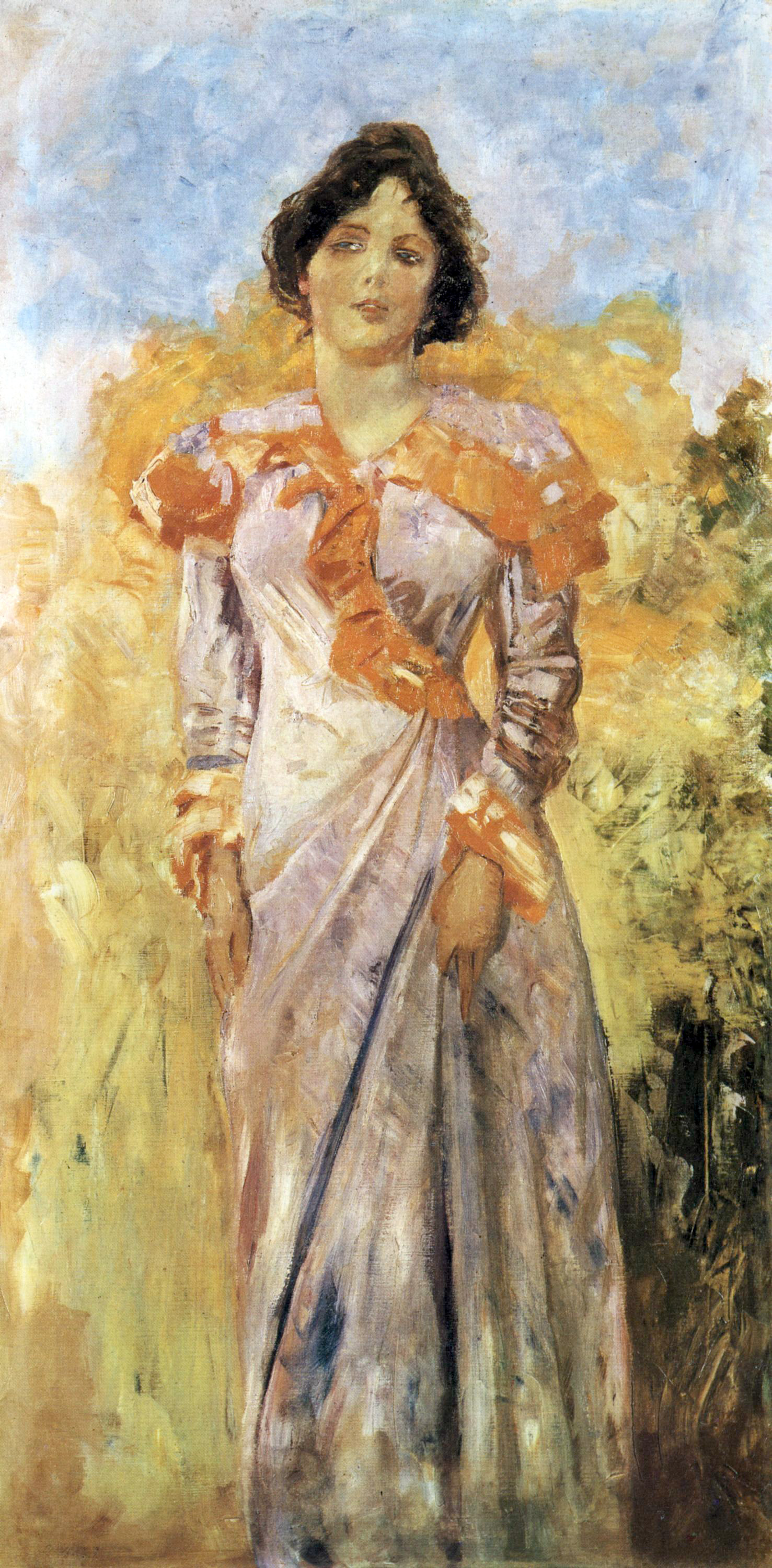
Portrait of Elsa Asenijeff (1904), oil on canvas, 100 cm × 50 cm (39 in × 20 in), Museum der Bildenden Künste, Leipzig

With a receptive audience developing in Paris, where the Franco-Uruguayan poet and art critic Jules Laforgue had been celebrating and advocating his prints, Klinger moved to Paris in 1883 where he lived until 1886 or 1887. Klinger first began sculpting about 1883, and sculpture slowly came to dominate his output in his later years. He conceived and started work on his Beethoven sculpture while in Paris but, it was not completed and fully realized until 1902. In 1889 Les XX (The Twenty) invited Klinger to exhibit his work in their annual winter exhibition that year in Brussels. He moved to Rome in 1889, staying until 1893, studying the Italian masters, where the 15th century artists and works from antiquity are said to have been something of a revelation to him. He also intensified his studies of anatomy, the nude, and the representation of mass and volume during this period of his life. It was a productive time in his career. In the 1890s, Klinger continued his gradual shift away from printmaking in favor of sculpting.

Klinger was an accomplished pianist and counted the composer Max Reger among his friends. A friendship with the composer Johannes Brahms developed over a period of 20 years, culminating with Klinger's publication of his print series Brahms Fantasies (1894) and Brahms's dedication of Vier ernste Gesänge (Four Serious Songs), Opus 121, to Klinger in 1896, a year before the composer's death.

In 1906 he founded the Villa Romana Prize. After buying a villa in Florence, complete with 15,000 square meter park, recipients of the prize were given the opportunity to stay for a few months and adsorbed the culture of the city. The first beneficiary of the prize was Gustav Klimt, however Klimt waived his honor and passed it on to Maximilian Kurzweil. Later recipients included Käthe Kollwitz, Max Beckmann, Ernst Barlach and Georg Kolbe.

Elsa Asenijeff (1867–1941) was a writer and poet, as well as a model, muse, and girlfriend of Klinger for about 15 years. They had a daughter Desirée Klinger (1900–1973) but were never married. In 1903 he moved away from Leipzig and bought a vineyard in Großjena [Gross Jena], near Naumburg, Germany, where he settled in his later years. In 1911 Klinger left Asenijeff, when her mental health begin to show signs of deteriorating, for an 18-year-old model, Gertrud Bock (1893–1932), who he ultimately married a few months before his death in 1920. Klinger left his estate to Gertrud. The sculptor Johannes Hartmann, a friend of Klinger's, served as caretaker of the Klinger estate and designed Klinger's tomb with portraits of Klinger and Gertrud. Johannes Hartmann married Gertrud Klinger in 1922, however, much of the remainder of their lives was spent in litigation with Klinger's daughter, Desirée Klinger over the estate.

Documentary photographs

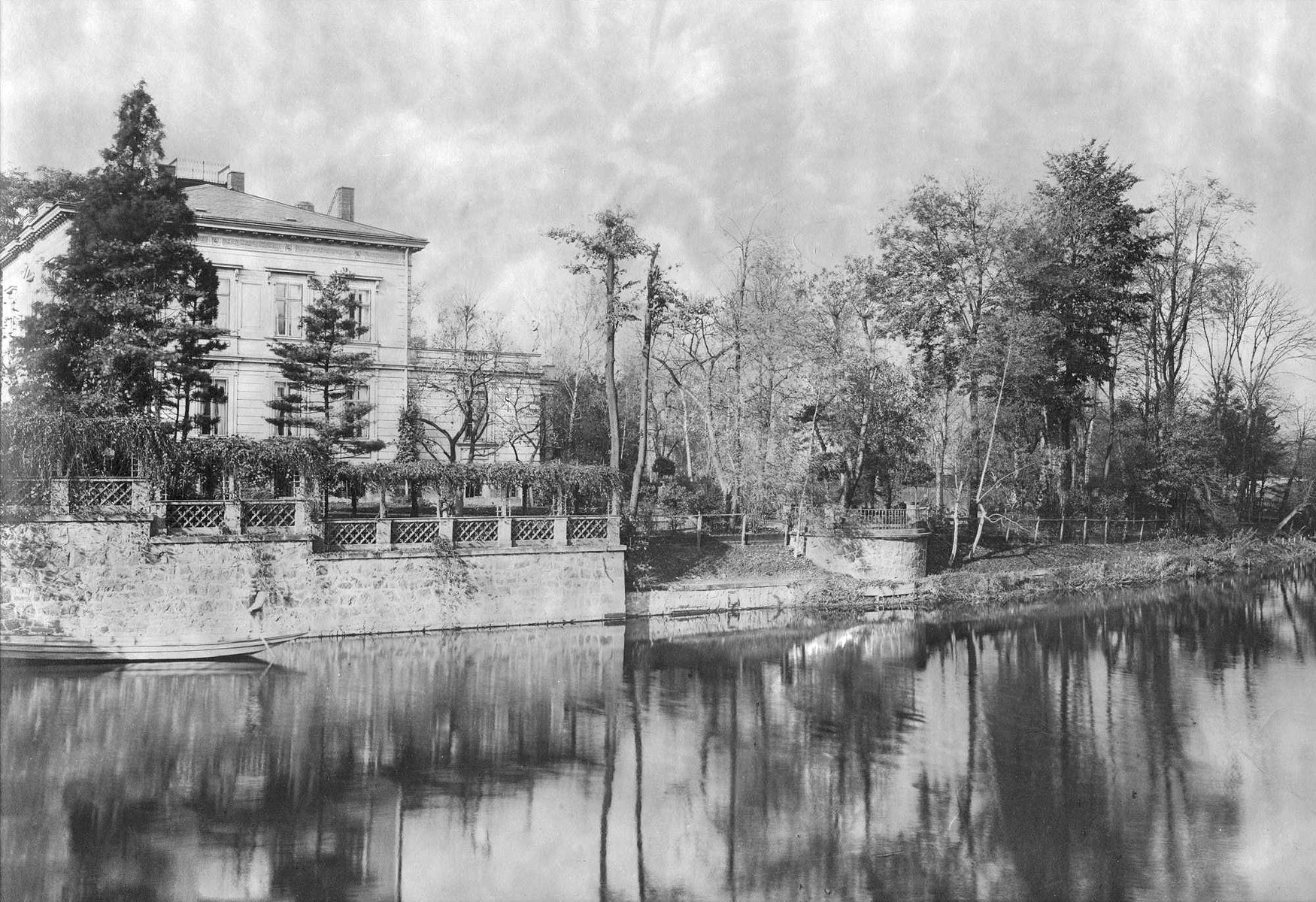
Villa Klinger in Leipzig, Germany, on the river Weisse Elster (c. 1900)

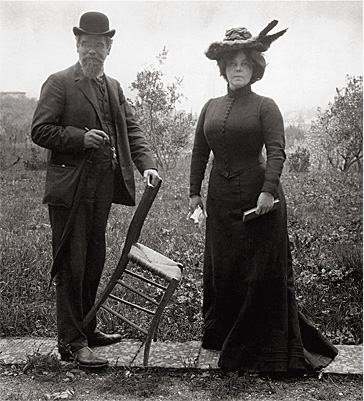
Max Klinger and Elsa Asanijeff in the garden of Villa Romana, Florence (1905)

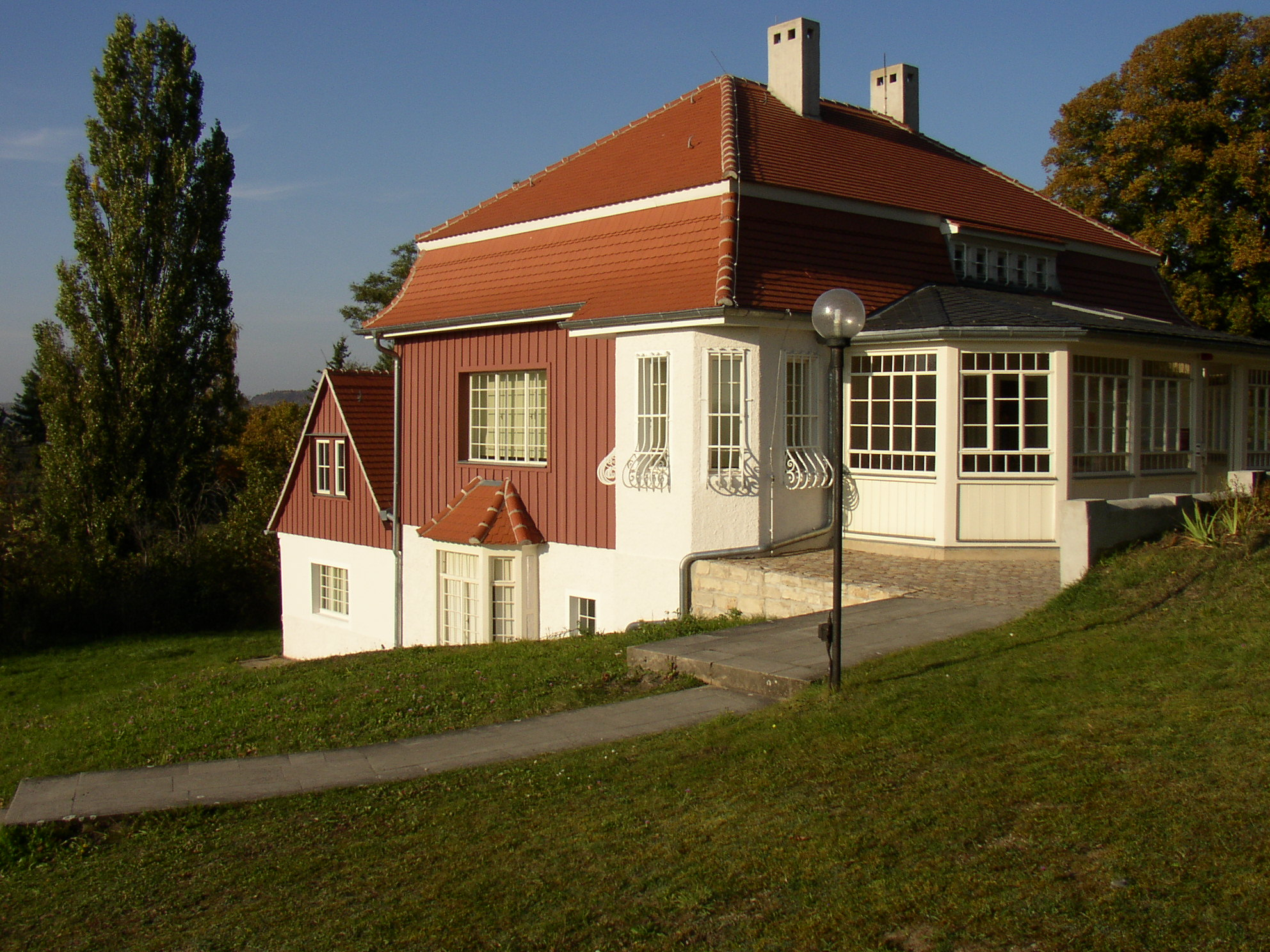
House on the vineyard of Max Klinger at Großjena, near Naumburg, Germany

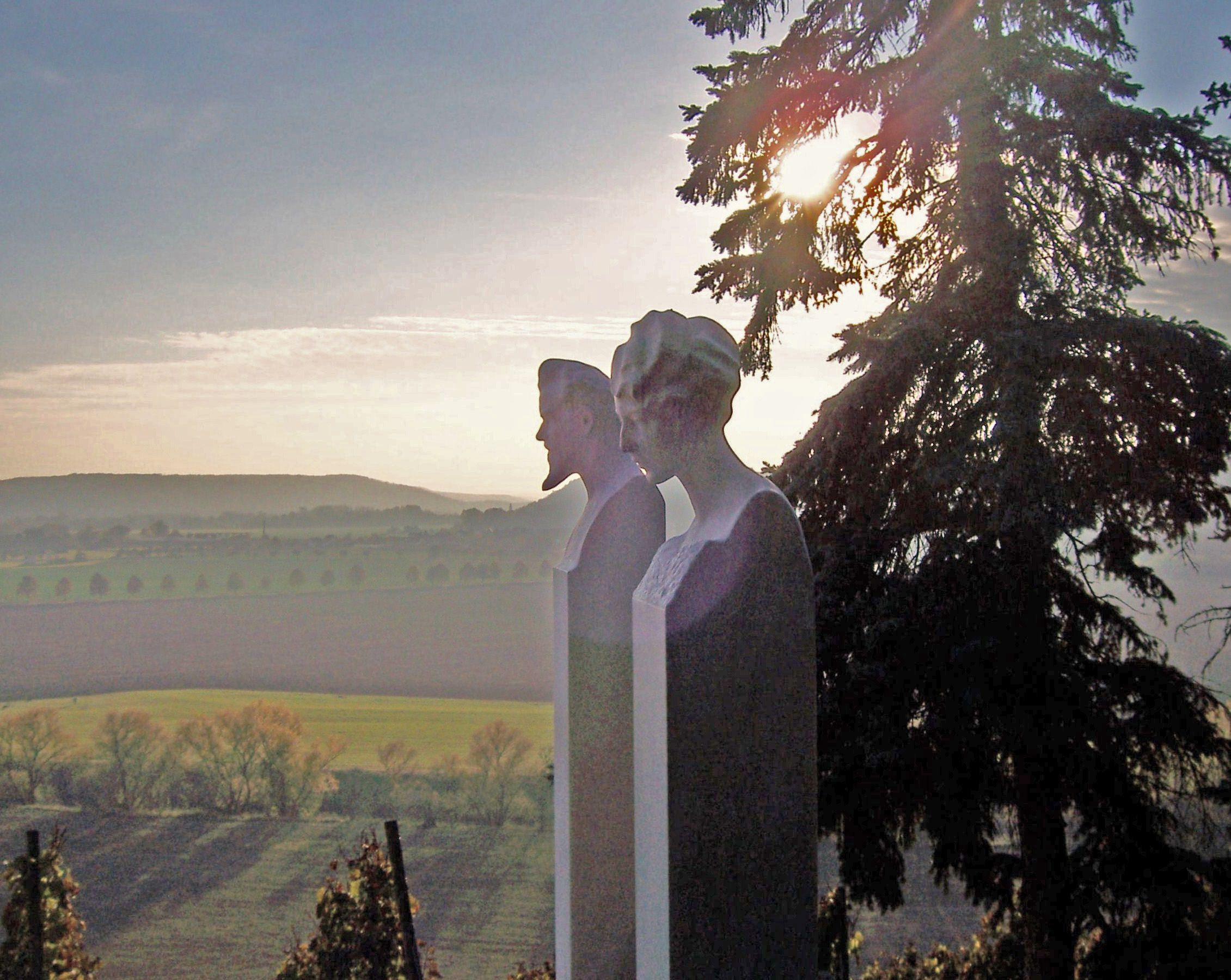
Memorial with portraits at the tomb of Max Klinger and Gertrud Klinger by Johannes Hartmann, Großjena, Germany

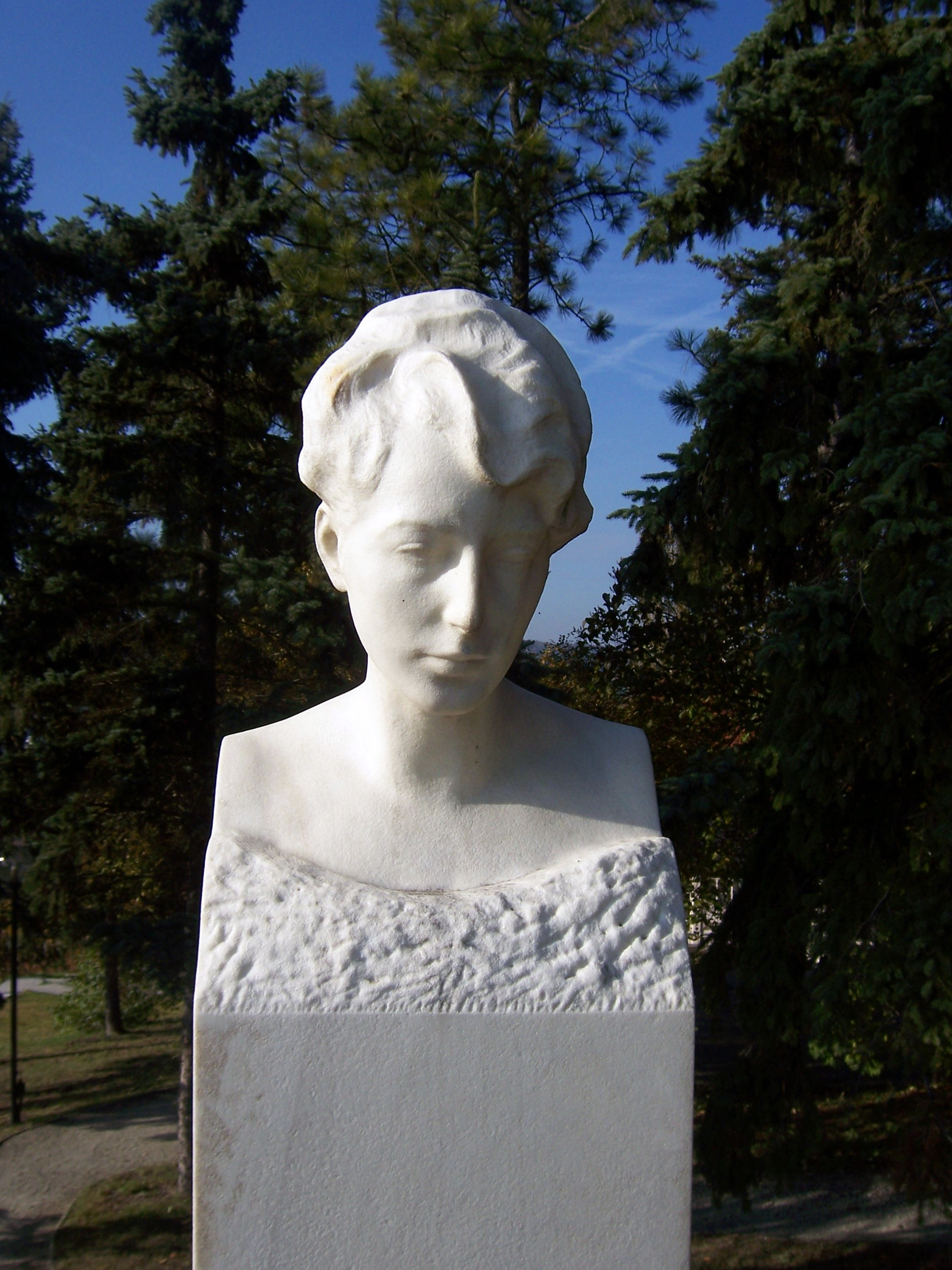
Portrait of Gertrud Klinger (1921), marble, by Johannes Hartmann

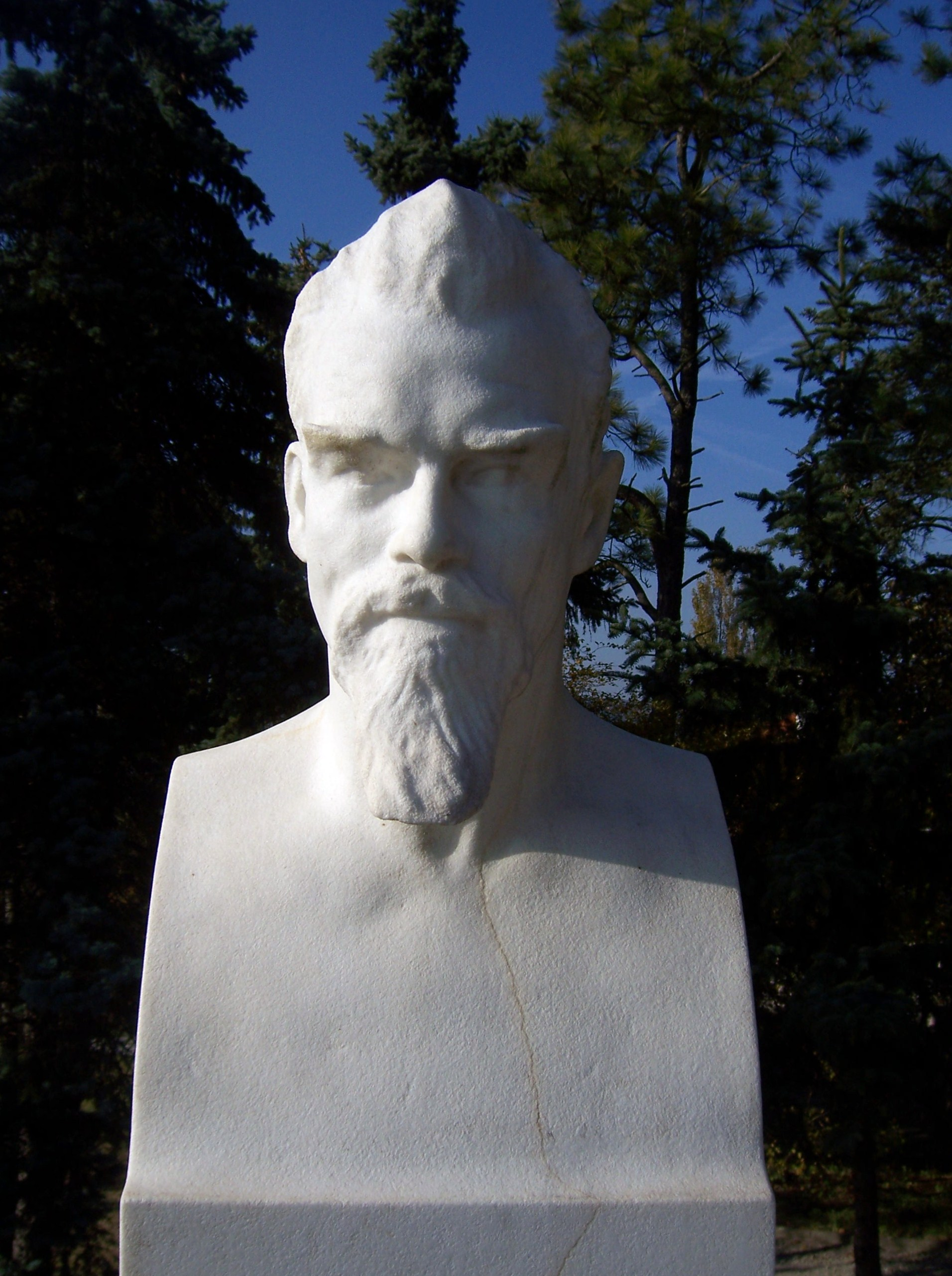
Portrait of Max Klinger (1921), marble, by Johannes Hartmann

== Art ==
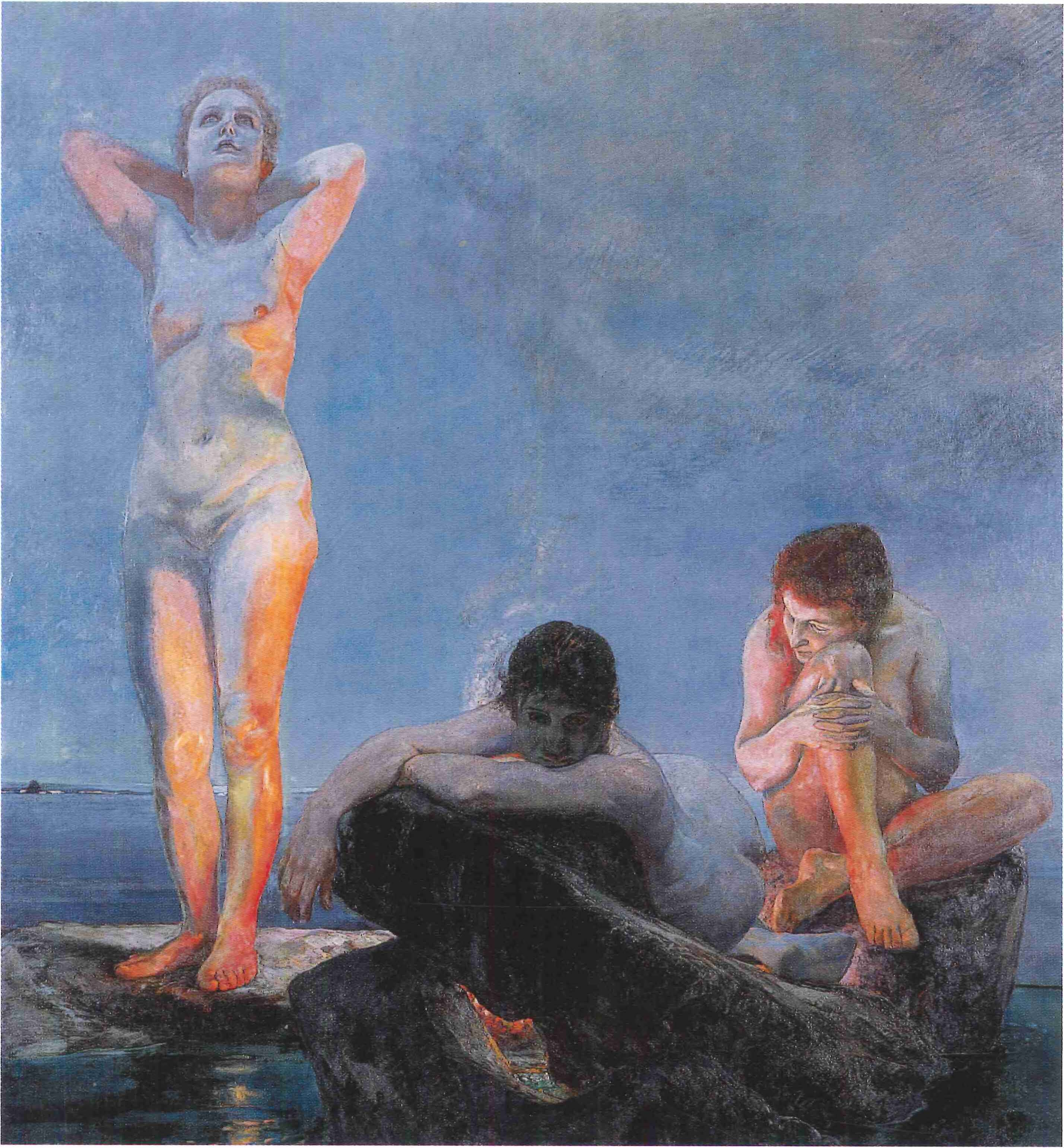
The Blue Hour (1890), oil on canvas, 191.5 × 176 cm (75.3 × 69.2 in), Museum der bildenden Künste, Leipzig, Germany

A significant portion of Klinger's reputation is associated with his many cycles and series of intaglio prints, which influenced numerous printmakers and artist of the late 19th and early 20th centuries. Klinger would adeptly integrate several intaglio media like aquatint, drypoint, and etching in a single plate, producing remarkable formal and tonal qualities. The subjects range from esoteric symbolism to darker aspects of realism. In the cycle A Life (1884), Klinger is often regarded as the first German artist to deal with prostitution as a social problem and the hypocrisy and injustices regarding societies attitude to the subject. The series follow a middle-class woman's descent into prostitution: impregnated, deserted, then rejected by society, she descends into the depths of urban life, and ridiculed by an apathetic and indifferent genteel society. The series A Love (1887) was dedicated to Arnold Böcklin another symbolist artist Klinger greatly admired.

In the series, Paraphrase on the Finding of a Glove (printed 1881), the pictures were based on images which came to Klinger in dreams after finding a glove at an ice-skating rink. In the leitmotivic device of a glove—belonging to a woman whose face we never see—Klinger anticipated the research of Freud and Krafft-Ebing on fetish objects. In this case, the glove becomes a symbol for the artist's romantic yearnings, finding itself, in each plate, in different dramatic situations, and performing the role that we might expect the figure of the beloved herself to fulfill. Semioticians have also seen in the symbol of the glove an example of a sliding signifier, or signifier without signified—in this case, the identity of the woman which Klinger is careful to conceal. The plates suggest various psychological states or existential crises faced by the artist protagonist (who bears a striking resemblance to the young Klinger).

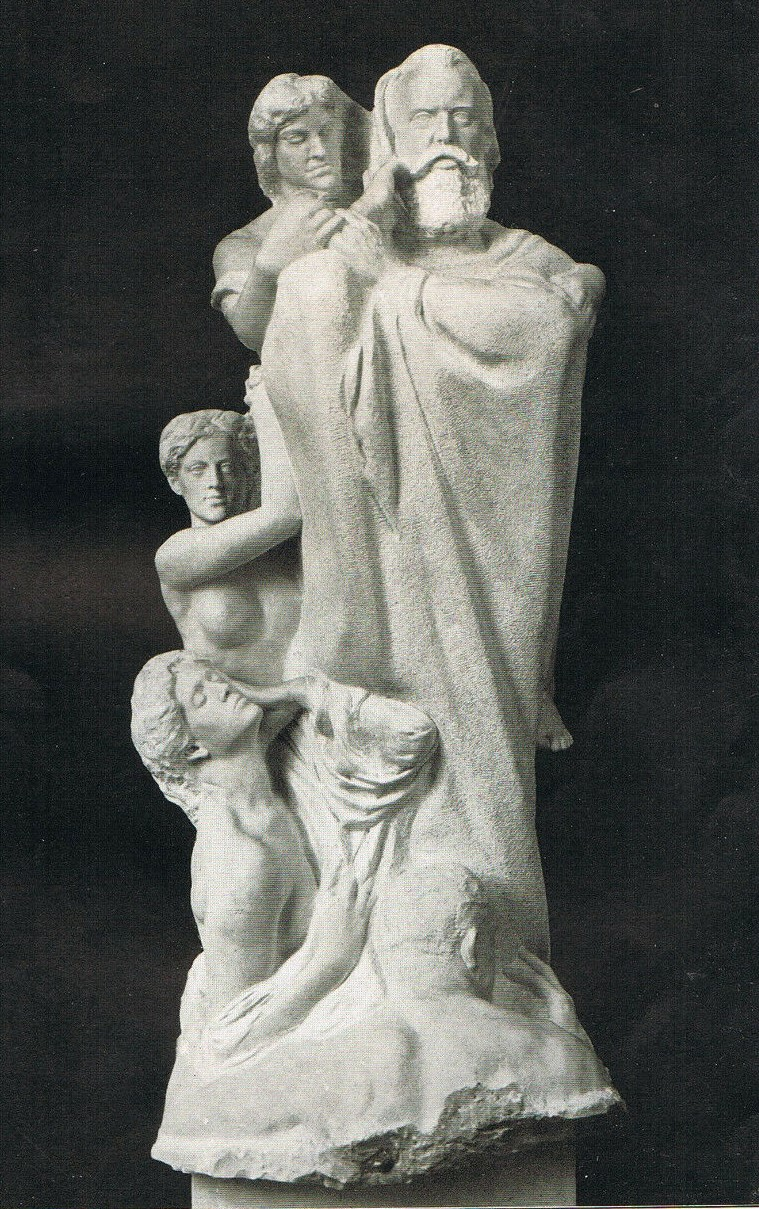
Johannes Brahms Monument

In Paris he started to draft his polemical text for Painting and Drawing, which was eventually published in 1891, and subsequently reissued a number of times. The manuscript was well circulated and well read, with a number of later artist and historians referencing it, including Giorgio de Chirico who called Klinger the "modern artist par excellence". In it Klinger asserted the idea that prints and the graphic arts should have a new and significant role in the arts, distinct from painting, and were best suited for stylistic and conceptual experimentation. Also that the differences between naturalism (realism) and neo-idealism, as well as form and content, were reconcilable, and both were possible. Concepts of the Gesamtkunstwerk, an all-embracing art form, with unity among the arts (e.g. painting, sculpture, literature, poetry, music, etc.), were also discussed.

Klinger had a lifelong passion for music and musical elements are often reflected and expressed in his art. His print cycles were given opus numbers, typically associated with musical publications. His series Brahms Fantasies (1894) was intended to be an amalgamation of music, poetry, and the visual arts: to be viewed with a performance of the composer's music, creating Gesamtkunstwerk or "all-embracing art form". Klinger produced sculptures of Beethoven, Brahms, and Liszt as well as a bust of Richard Wagner and the plinth of the Richard Wagner Memorial (1911).

Inspired by recent accounts of archaeological discoveries of antique sculptural remains made from various colored stones, Klinger utilized a variety of materials in many of his sculptures. A mixture of bronze, ivory, alabaster, and several different marbles were used in Beethoven. He studied and took measurements of Beethoven's death mask in Vienna and traveled to Laas in southwestern France to personally select the alabaster, and the Pyrenees and Syra (or Syros), Greece to select marbles. Elsa Asenijeff wrote of the unusually complex and difficult process involved with casting the large bronze throne from wax in her book Max Klinges Beethoven: Eine kunst-technische Studie (Max Klinge's Beethoven: A Practical Artistic Study) published in 1902. The sculpture was exhibited in an earlier stage of development in Paris in 1885 and later rejected from major exhibitions in Berlin 1887 and 1888. It developed something of a cult-like reputation over the years.

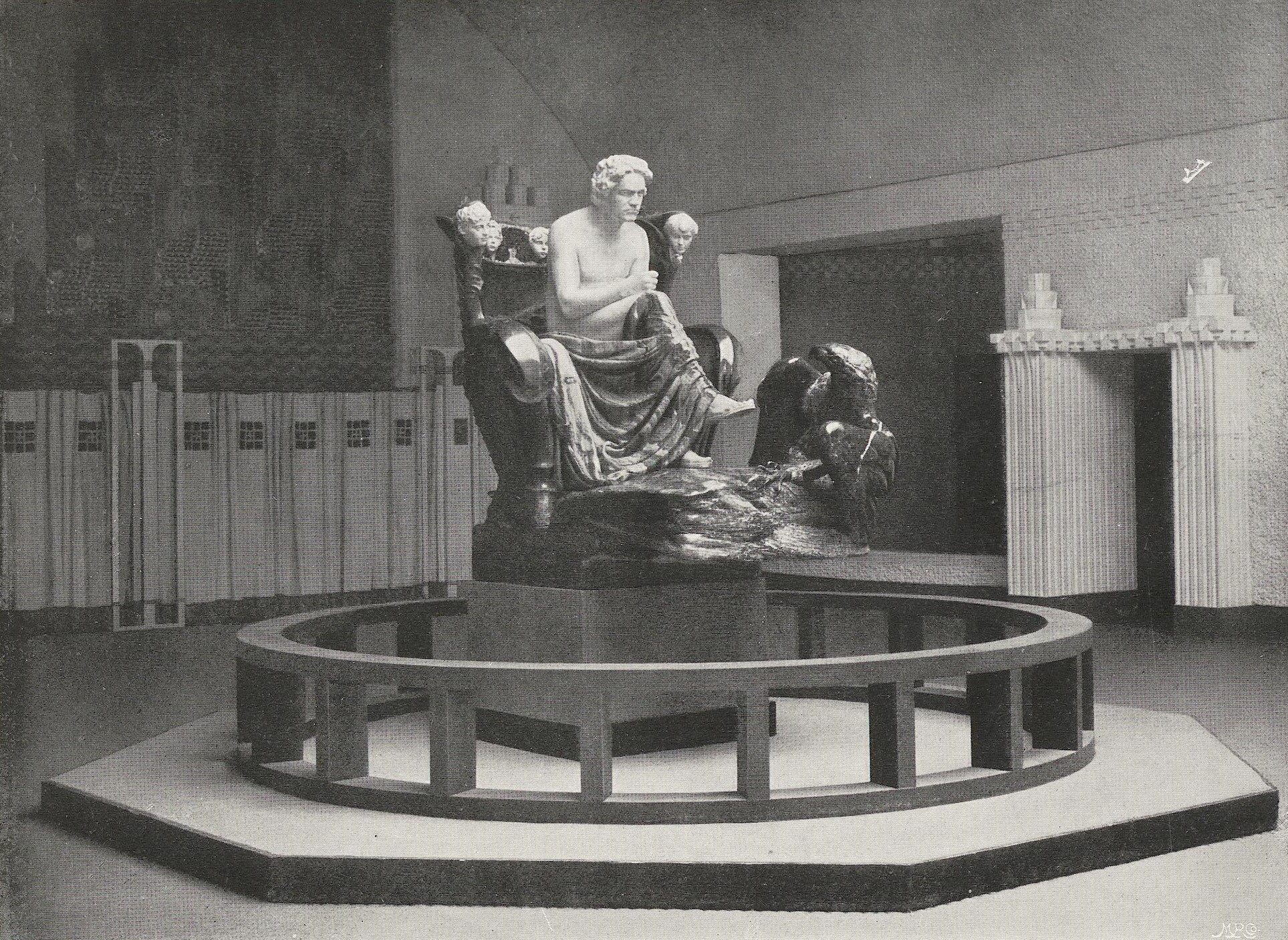
Beethoven photographed in 1902 at the 14th exhibition of the Vienna Secession with Alfred Roller's mural Night Descending on the wall

Beethoven was the theme of the 14th exhibition of the Vienna Secession in 1902, and Max Klinger's sculpture was brought to Vienna as the centerpiece. The Vienna Secession had hoped to purchase the sculpture but this was not to come to fruition. Headed by Alfred Roller, the artist of the Secession created works on the theme for the galleries and Roller and the architect Josef Hoffmann oversaw the overall installation. Klinger's Beethoven was installed in the central hall with Alfred Roller's mural Night Descending on the wall behind it. Gustav Klimt's seminal Beethoven Frieze was visible in an adjoining room. Even the normally shy and retiring Gustav Mahler was persuaded to transcribe music from Beethoven's Ninth Symphony for trumpets and rehearse the musicians for the opening. The exhibition, presented within the specific architecture, with the sculpture, paintings, and music was in part, offered in the context of the Gesamtkunstwerk, comparative to a contemporary installation. The exhibition received extensive press, and generated a scandal. Most of the hostile and negative reviews were directed at Gustav Klimt and his murals. However, Klinger's sculpture received its criticism as well, some dismissing it as kitsch, while others were offended by seeing Beethoven represented nude. Auguste Rodin attended the exhibition and was reported to have walked past Klinger's sculpture without comment, although at a later time he said it had nothing to do with sculpture.

Klinger was cited by many artists (notably Giorgio de Chirico) as being a major link between the symbolist movement of the 19th century and the start of the metaphysical movement. His work was also admired and a formative influence on later artist such as Max Ernst and other surrealist artist. The historian Holger Jacob-Friesen illustrates and discusses in detail the influence of Klinger's prints on artist such as Franz von Stuck, Käthe Kollwitz, Edvard Munch, Lovis Corinth, Otto Greiner, Alfred Kubin, Max Slevogt, Paul Klee, Richard Müller, Oskar Kokoschka, Max Beckmann, Horst Janssen, as well as De Chirico and Ernst.

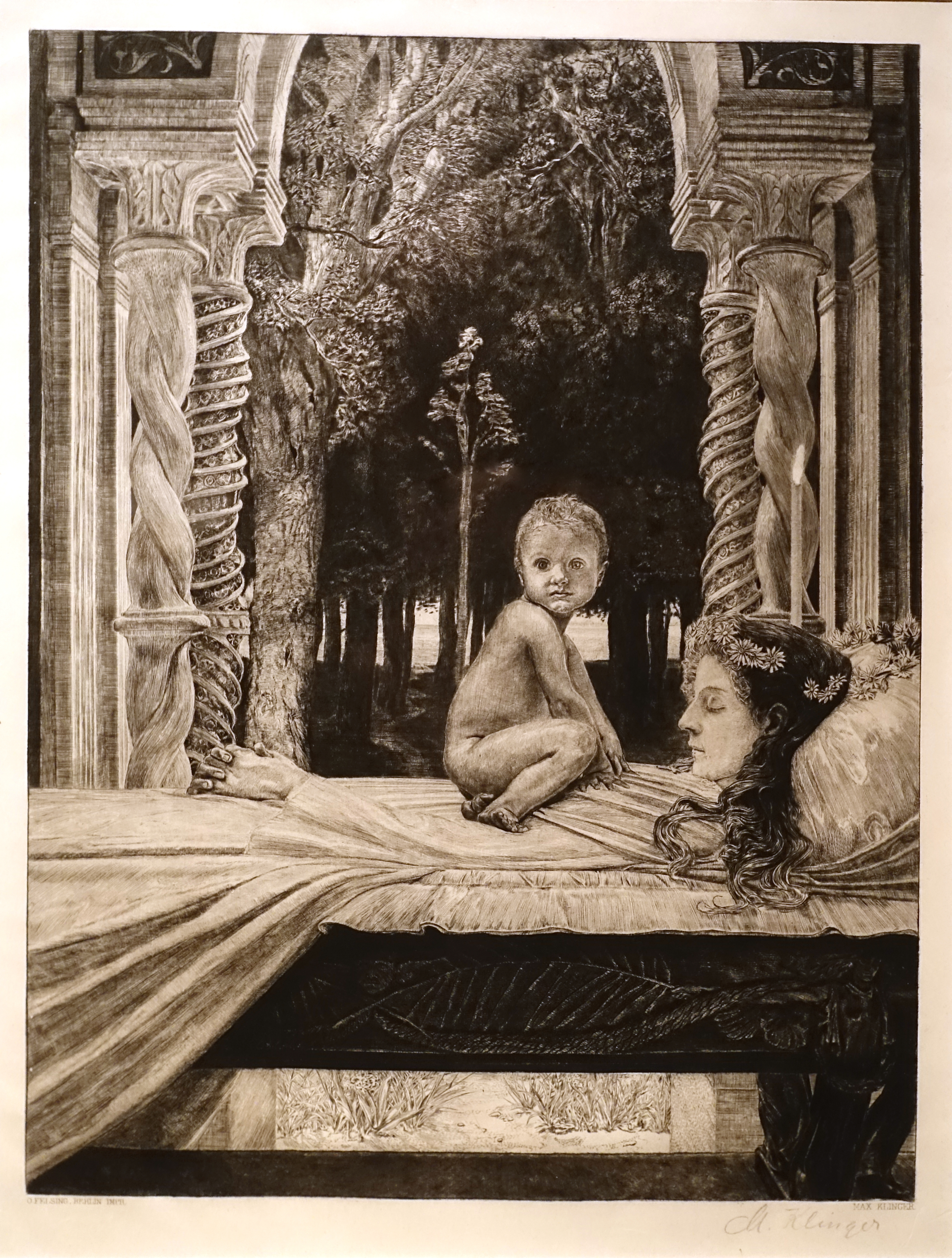
Mother and Child (Dead Mother), 1898, engraving and etching, plate size 45.6 by 34.9 centimetres (18.0 in × 13.7 in): from the series Vom Tode [From Death], Opus XIII.

Print series published by Max Klinger

- 1879. Radierte Skizzen (Etched Sketches), Opus I, nos. 1–8.
- 1879. Rettungen Ovidischer Opper (Deliverances of Ovidian Victims) Opus II, nos. 1–13.
- 1880. Eva und die Zukunft (Eva and the Future), Opus III, nos. 1–6.
- 1880, Amor und Psyche (Cupid and Psyche), Opus V, book with 46 etchings
- 1881. Intermezzi (Intermezzi), Opus IV, nos. 1–12.
- 1881. Paraphrase über den Fund eines Handschuhs (Paraphrase on the Finding of a Glove), Opus VI, nos. 1–10.
- 1883. Vier Landschaften (Four Landscapes), Opus VII, nos. 1–4.
- 1883. Dramen (Dramas), Opus IX, nos. 1–10.
- 1884. Ein Leben (A Life) Opus VIII, nos. 1–15.
- 1887. Eine Liebe (A Love), Opus X, nos. 1–10.
- 1889. Vom Tode, Erster Theil (On Death, Part One) Opus XI, nos. 1–10.
- 1894. Brahmsphantasie (Brahms Fantasy), Opus XII, nos. 1-41.
- 1898–1910. Vom Tode, Zweiter Theil (On Death, Part Two), Opus XIII, nos. 1–12.

== In contemporary culture ==
In Elsa Bernstein's naturalist play Dämmerung, Klinger is mentioned in the third act when Carl talks of being able to afford "etchings by Klinger" for 80 francs.

Inspection Medical Hermeneutics, an infamous Moscow art collective, based their 1991 installation Klinger’s Boxes, on an idea inspired by Klinger's Paraphrase on the Finding of a Glove.

Asteroid 22369 Klinger is named in his honor.

One of the largest collections of Klinger's work in the USA is held by the Jack Daulton Collection in Los Altos Hills, California.

== Gallery ==
Paintings

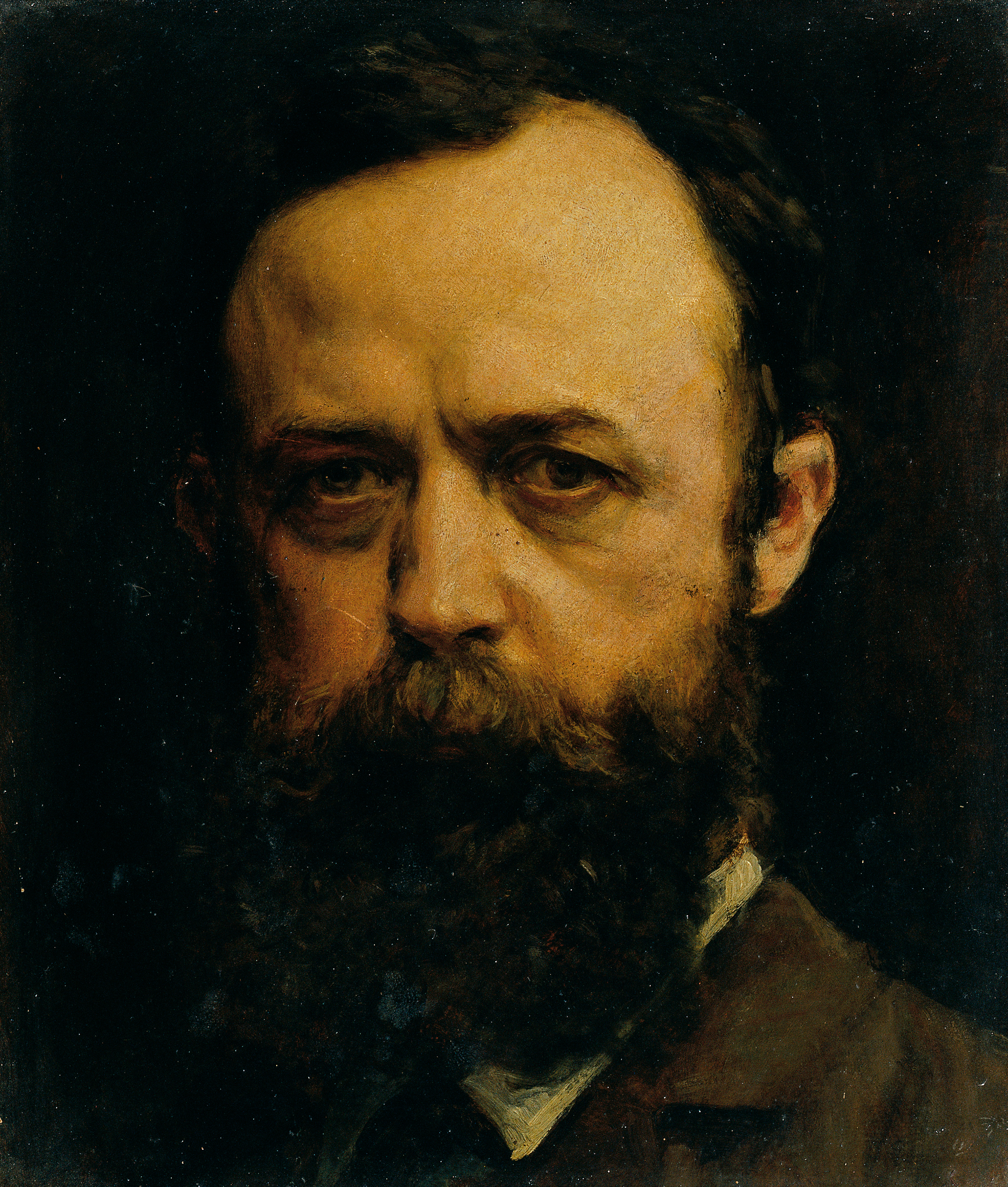
Portrait of a Gentleman (undated), oil on cardboard, 37.5 x 32.2 cm (14.7 x 12.6 in), Österreichische Galerie Belvedere, Vienna, Austria

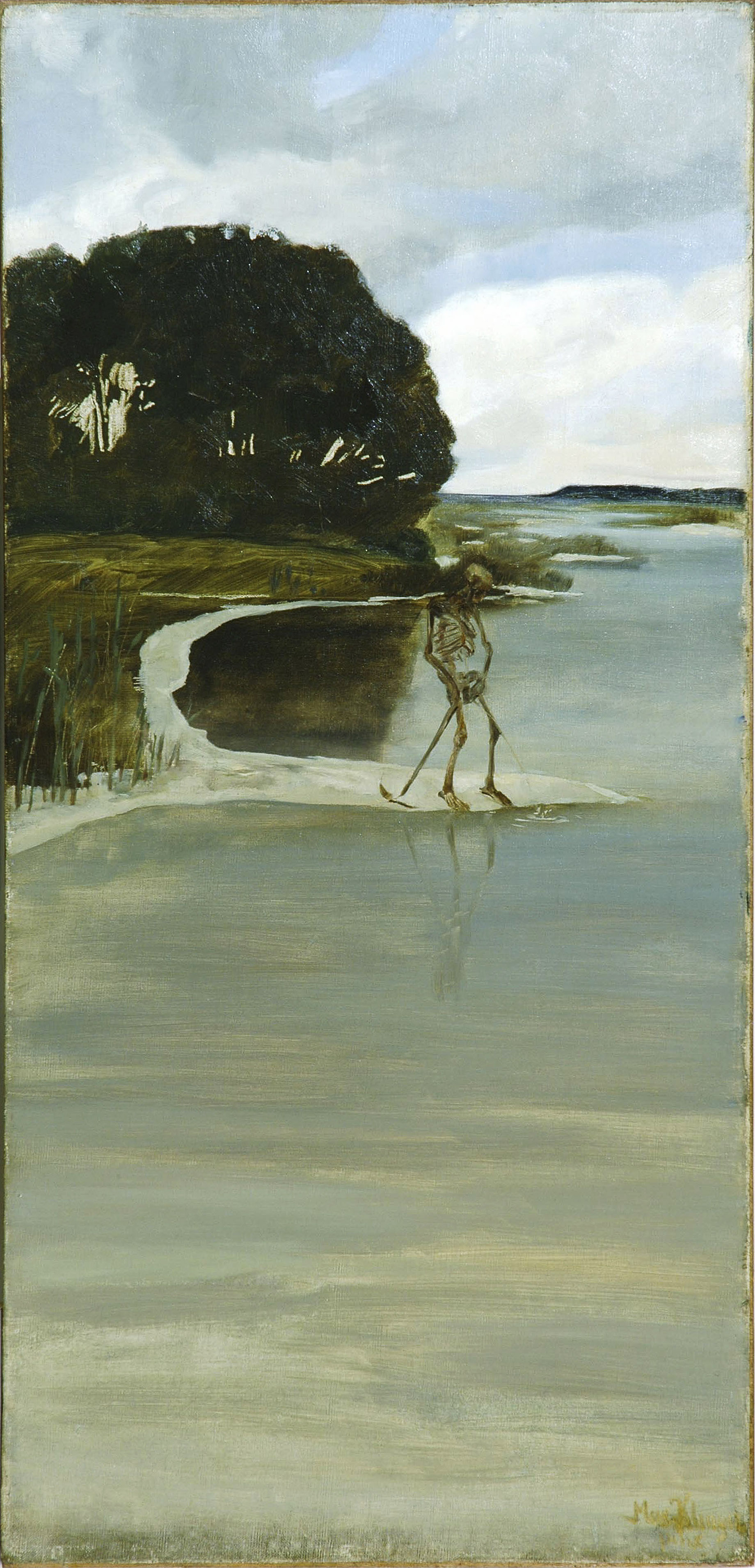
Pissing Death (1880), oil on canvas, 95 x 45 cm. Museum der bildenden Künste, Leipzig, Germany.

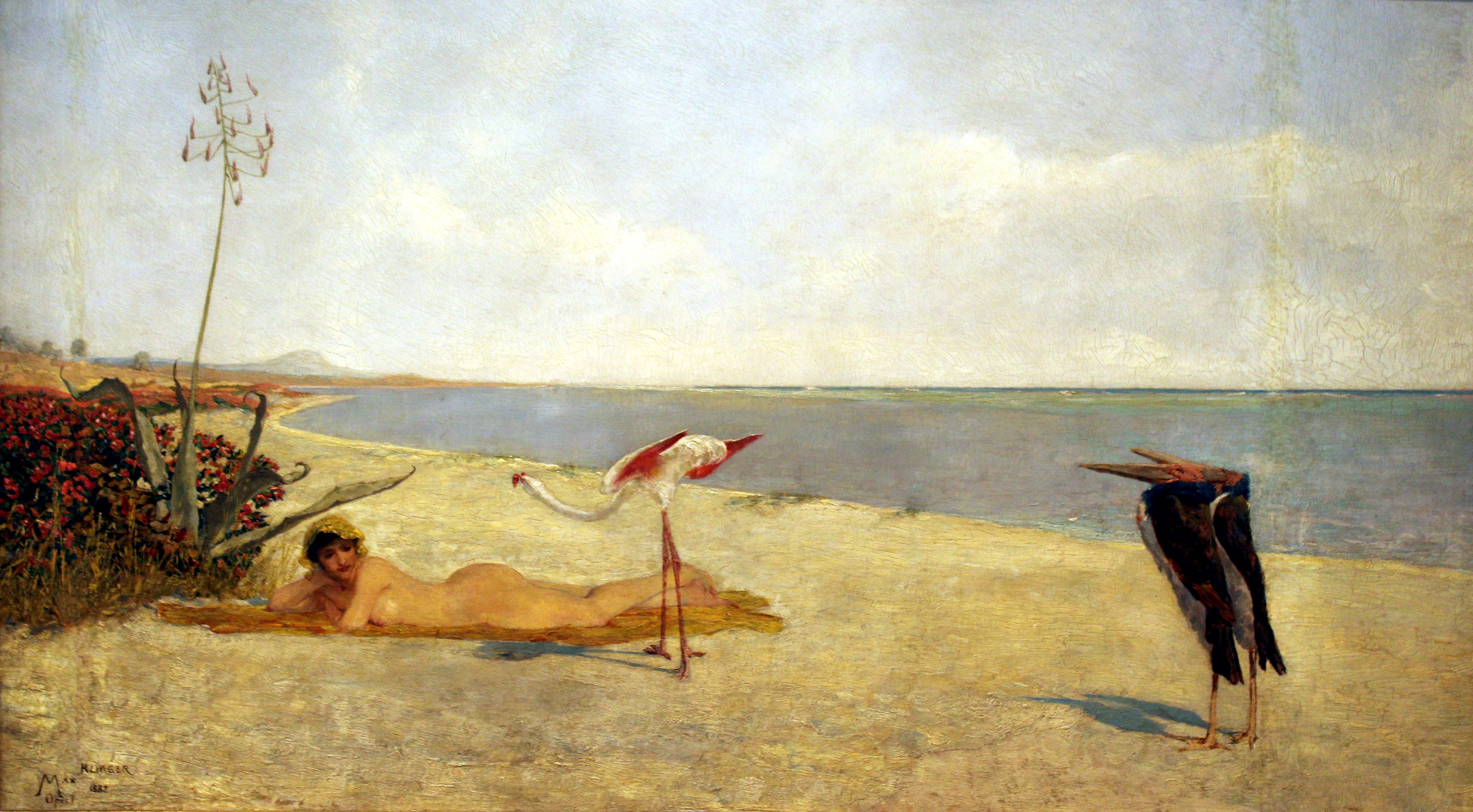
A Legation (1882), oil on panel, 37 x 63 cm (14.5 x 24.8 in), Museum der bildenden Künste, Leipzig, Germany

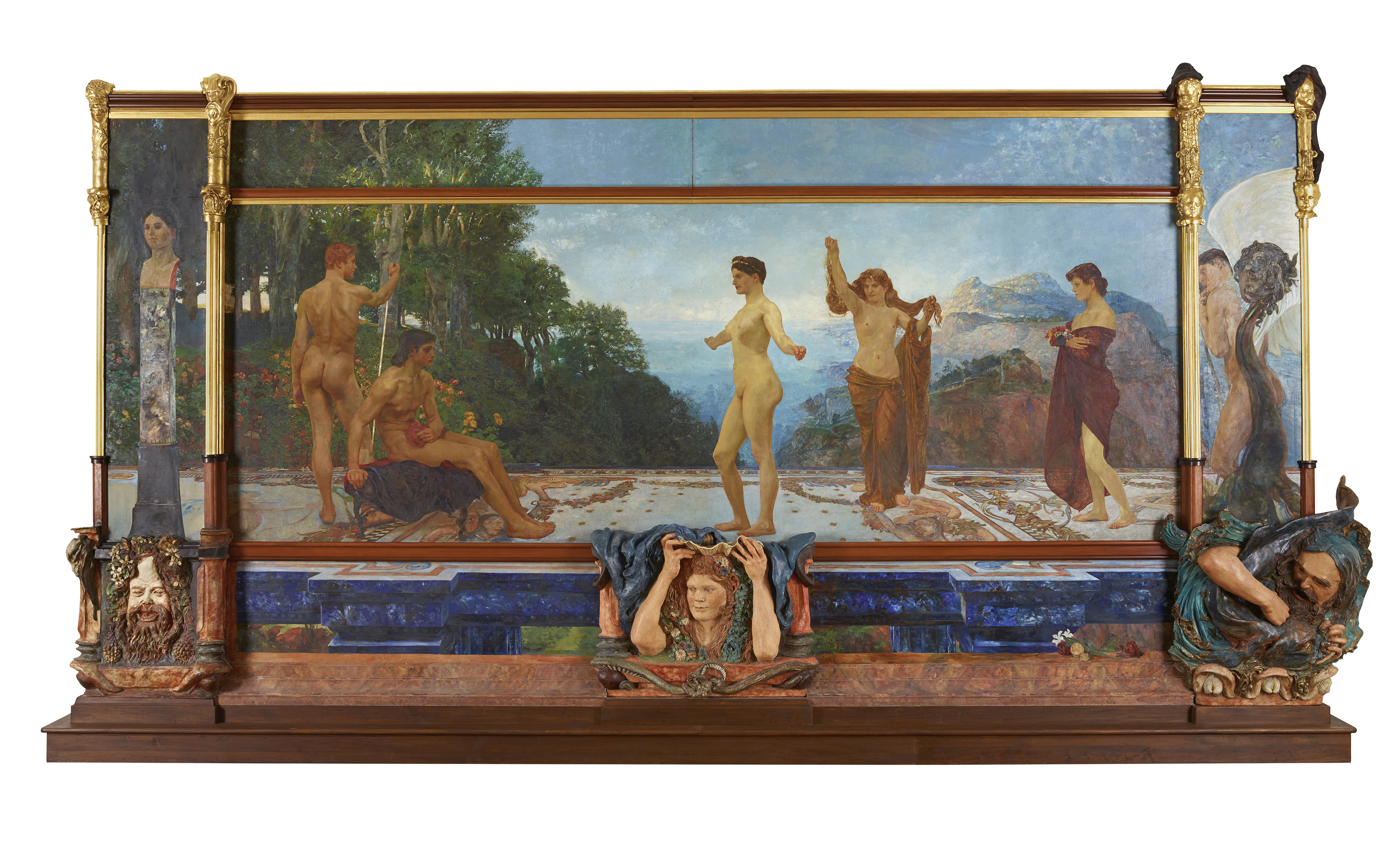
The Judgment of Paris (1885–87), oil on canvas, wood and plaster, overall dimensions: 370 × 752 × 65 cm, Österreichische Galerie Belvedere, Vienna, Austria.

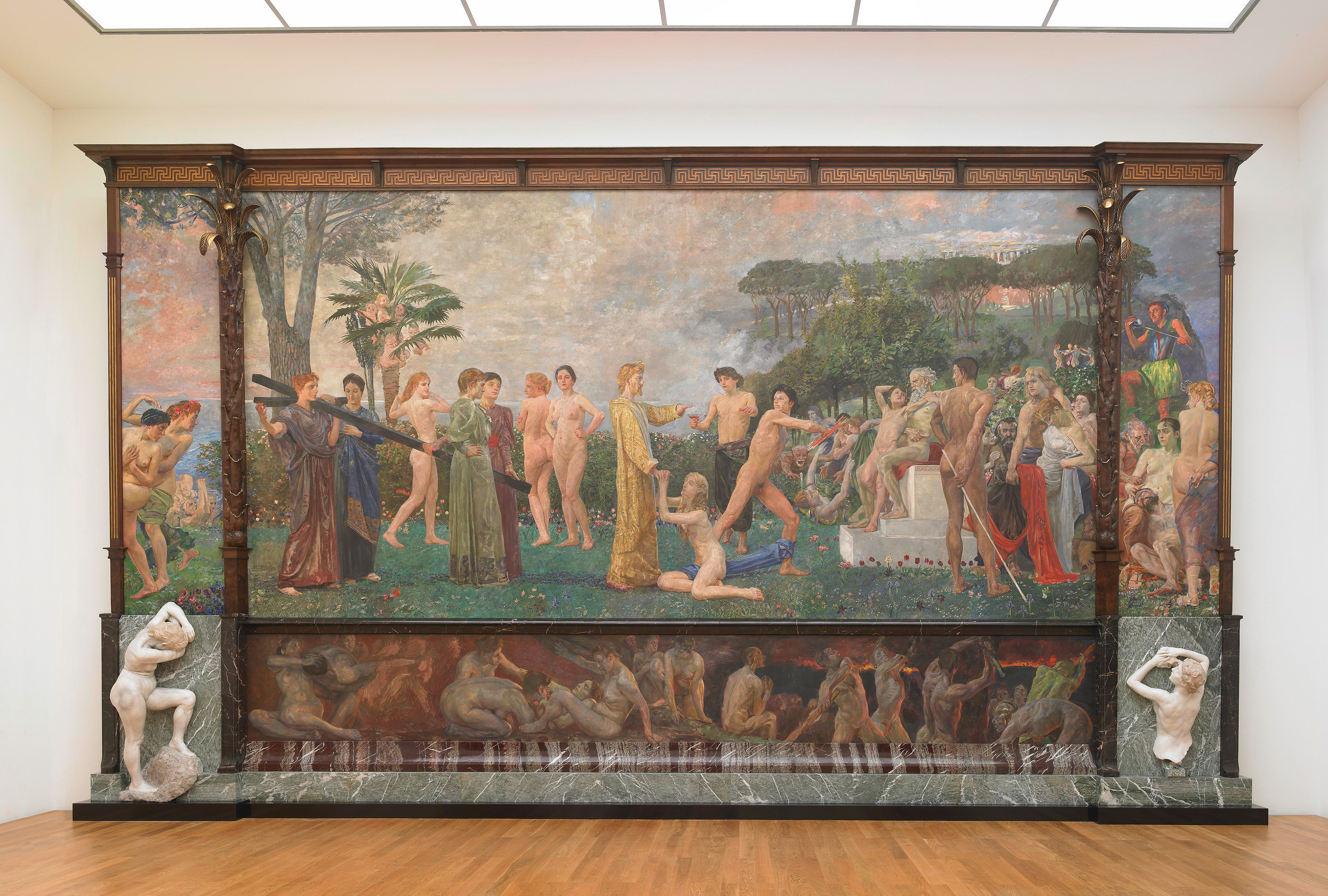
Christ in Olympus (1897), oil on canvas with mixed media, overall dimensions: 549 × 965 × 65 cm, (3800 kg), Österreichische Galerie Belvedere, Vienna, Austria.

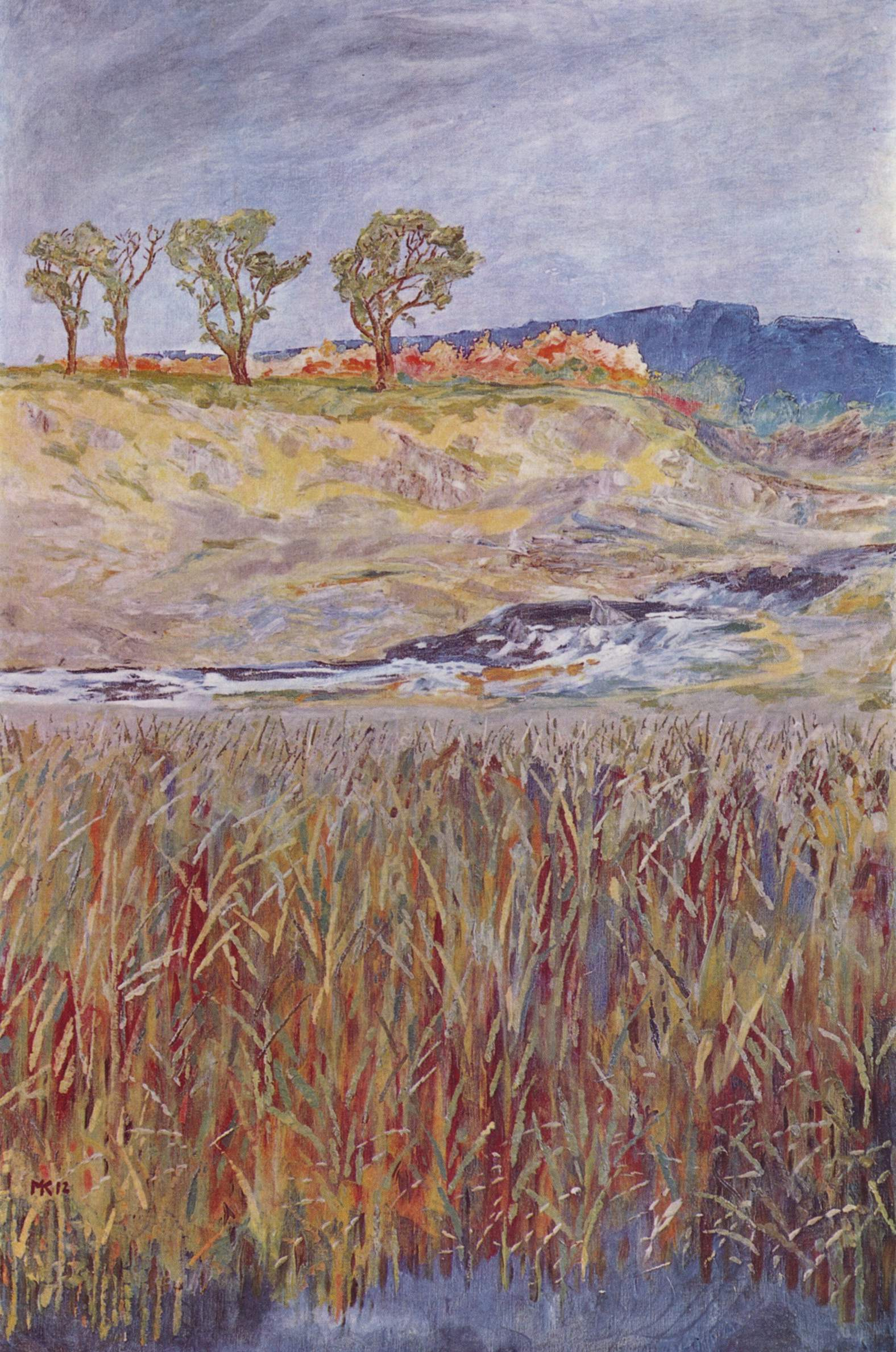
Landscape on the Unstrut (1912), oil on canvas, 192 x 126 cm (75.5 x 49.6 in), Lindenau-Museum, Altenburg, Germany

Sculptures

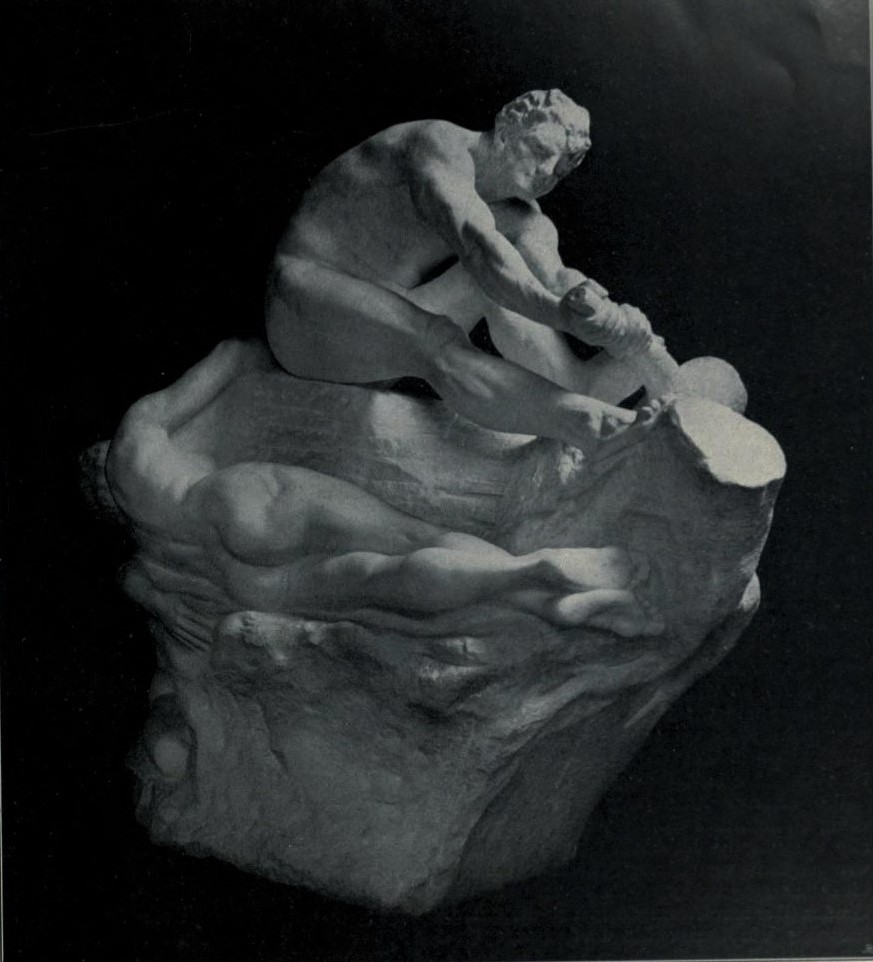
The Drama (before 1904), demotions and collection unknown

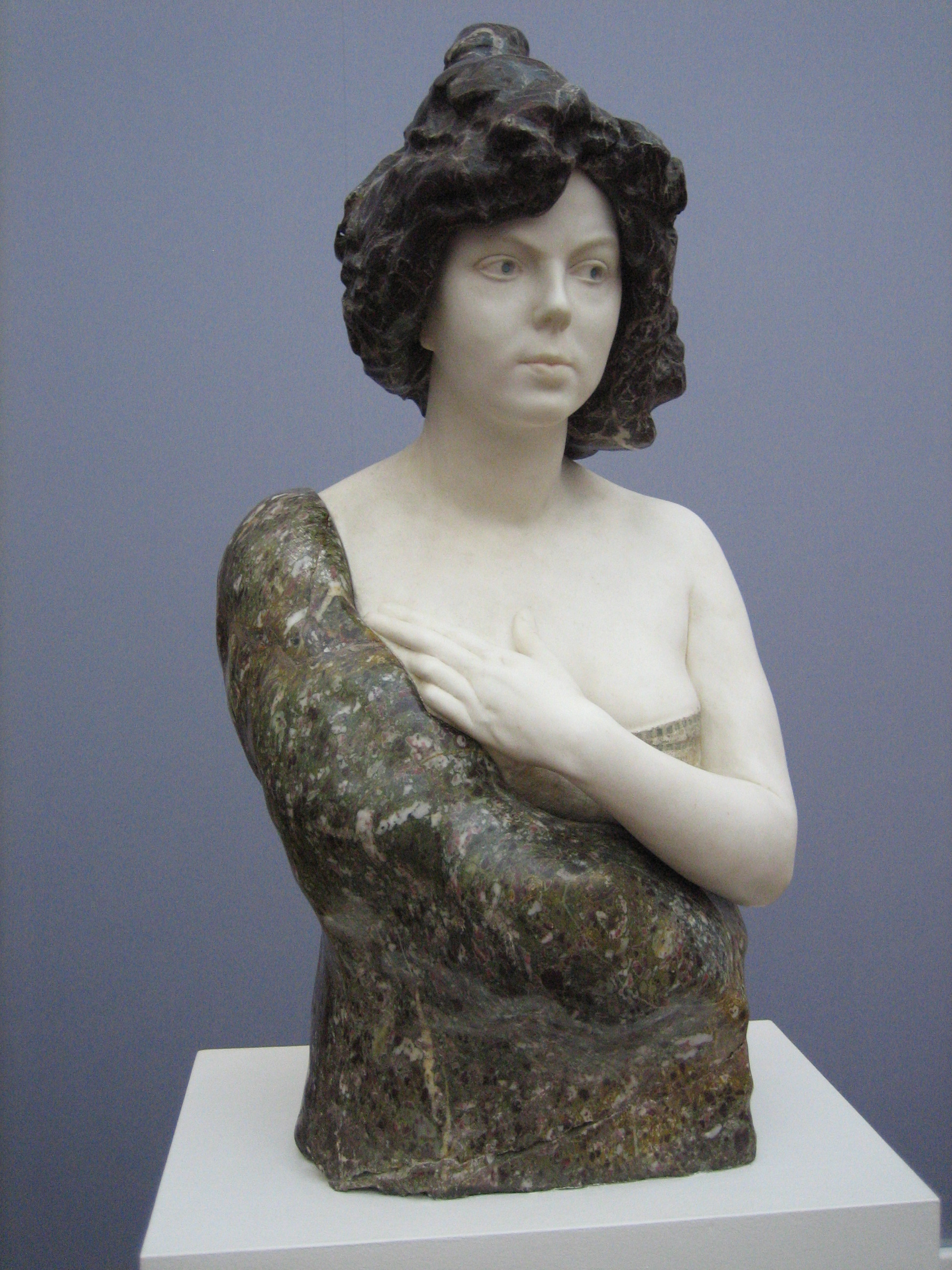
Elsa Asenijeff, circa 1900

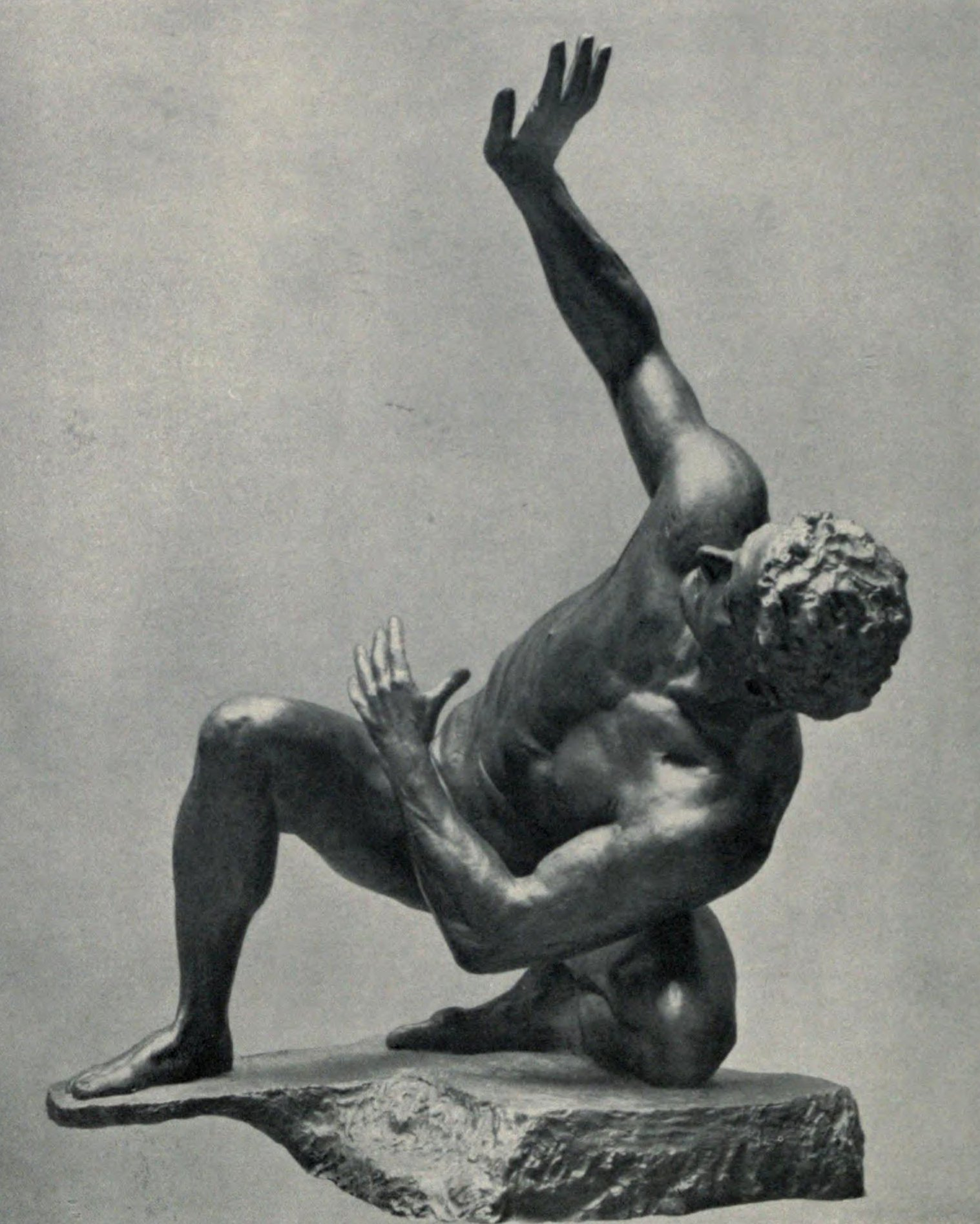
Athlete (1901), demotions and collection unknown

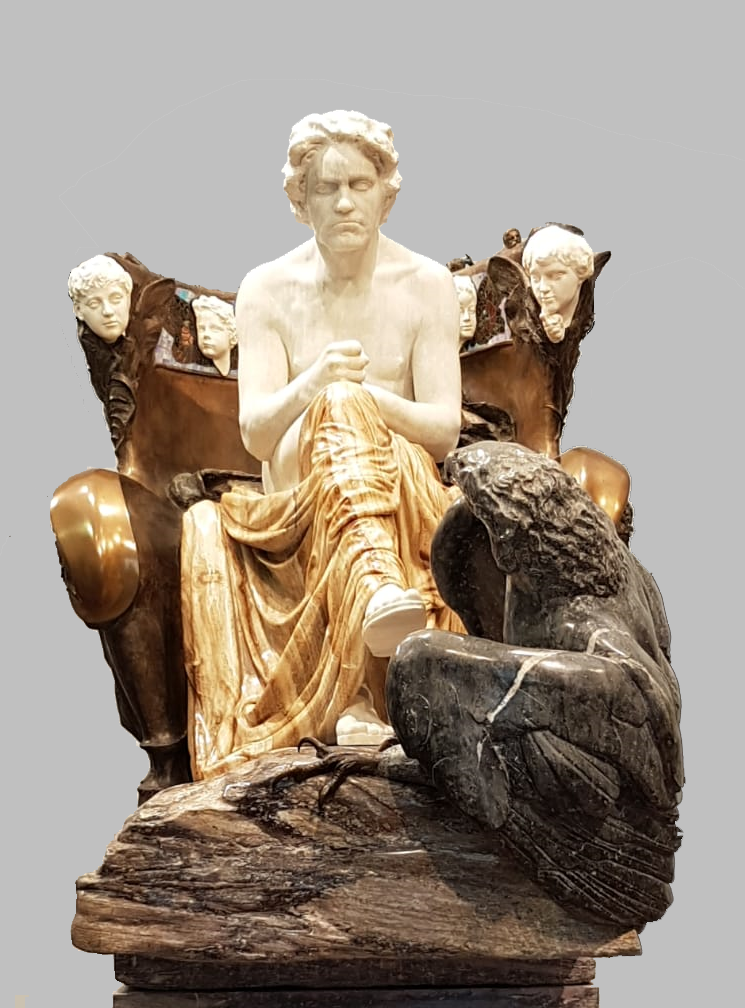
Beethoven (circa 1883–1902), height: 3.10 m, Leipzig, Museum of Fine Arts

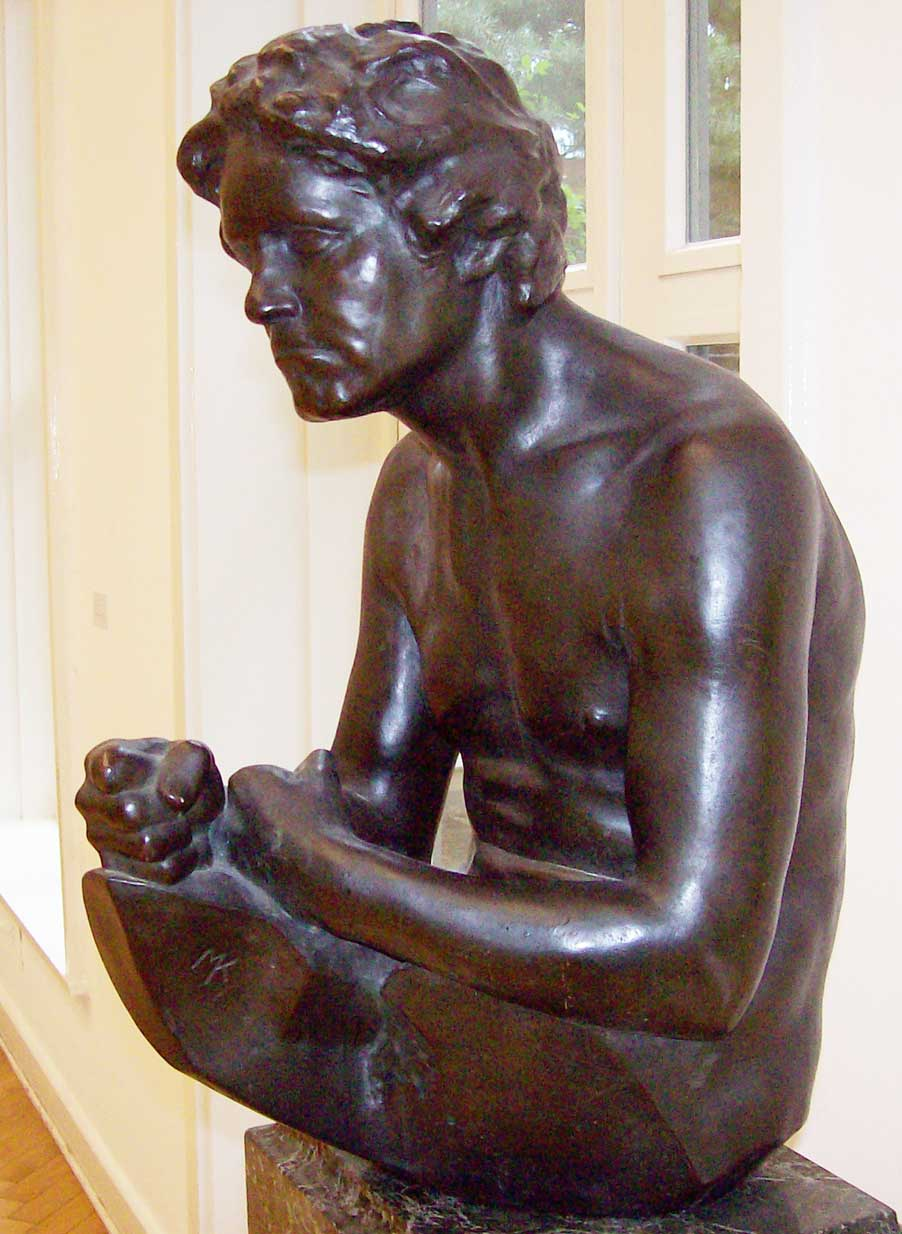
Beethoven Torso (1902), bronze

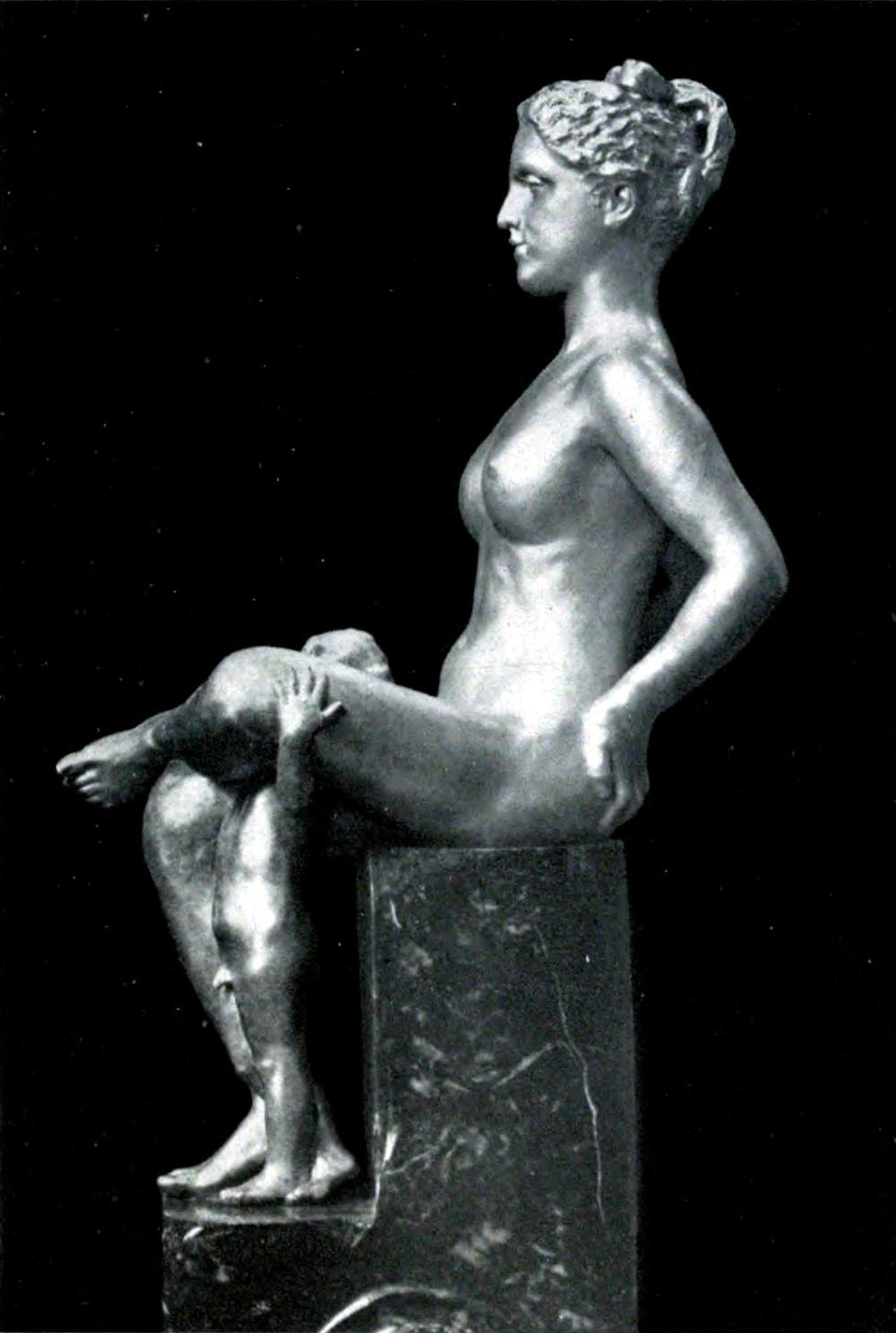
Galatea (1906), cast silver and marble, 111.1 × 31.8 × 47.6 cm

Drawings, prints and graphics

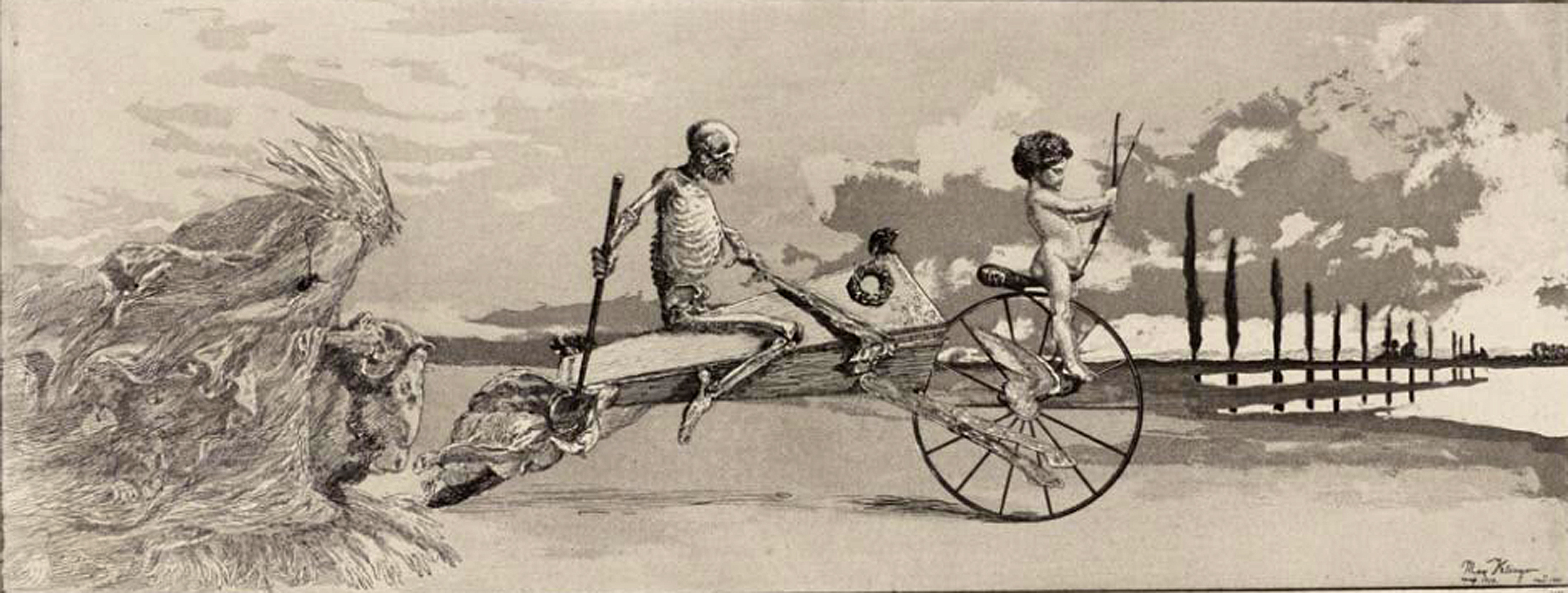
Cupid, Death, and the Beyond, from the series Intermezzi, Opus IV, no. 12 (1881), etching and aquatint, 15.7 × 40.7 cm, Philadelphia Museum of Art

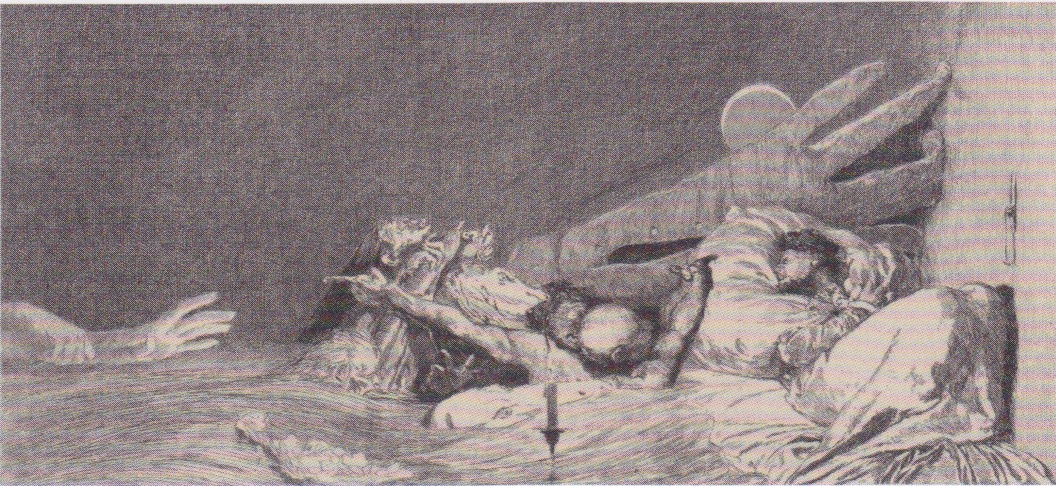
Anxieties from the series Paraphrase on the Finding of a Glove Opus VI, no. 7 (1881), etching, 7, 13,5 x 25,7 cm, Albertina, Vienna

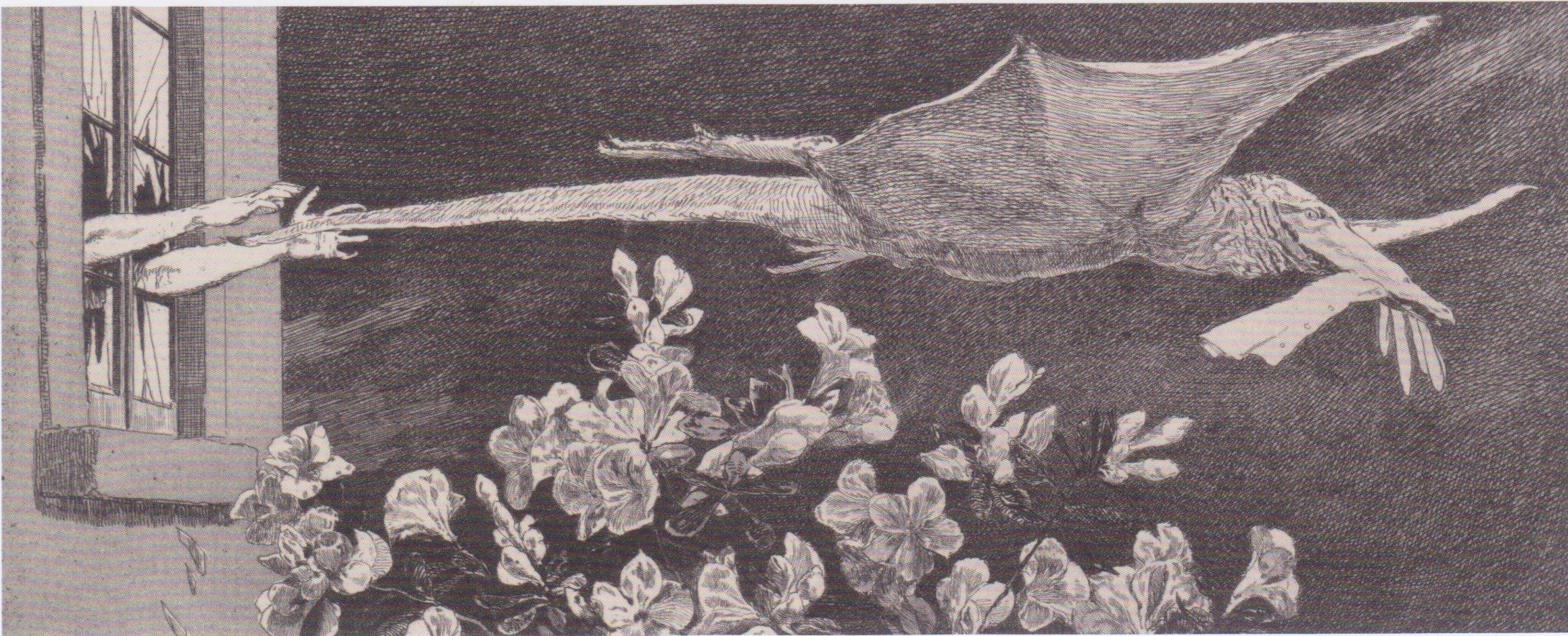
Abduction from the series Paraphrase on the Finding of a Glove Opus VI, no. 9 (1881), etching, 9, 11,4 x 26,1 cm, Albertina, Vienna

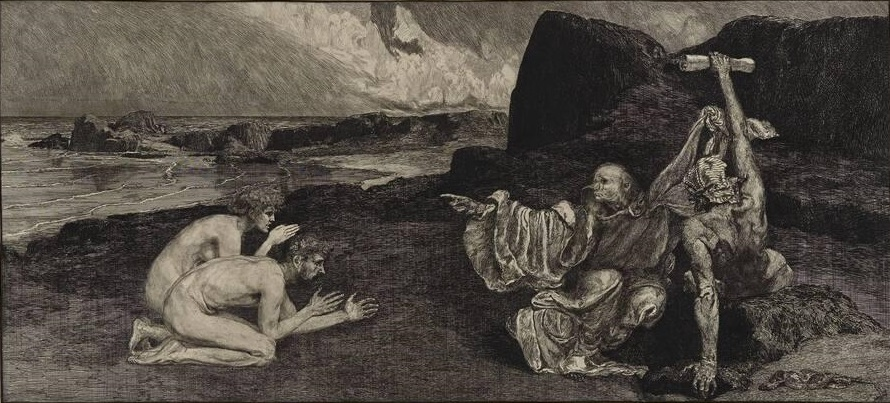
Intermezzo, from the series A Love, Opus X, no. 6 (1887), etching with engraving and aquatint, 19.1 x 42 cm, Museum of Fine Arts, Houston

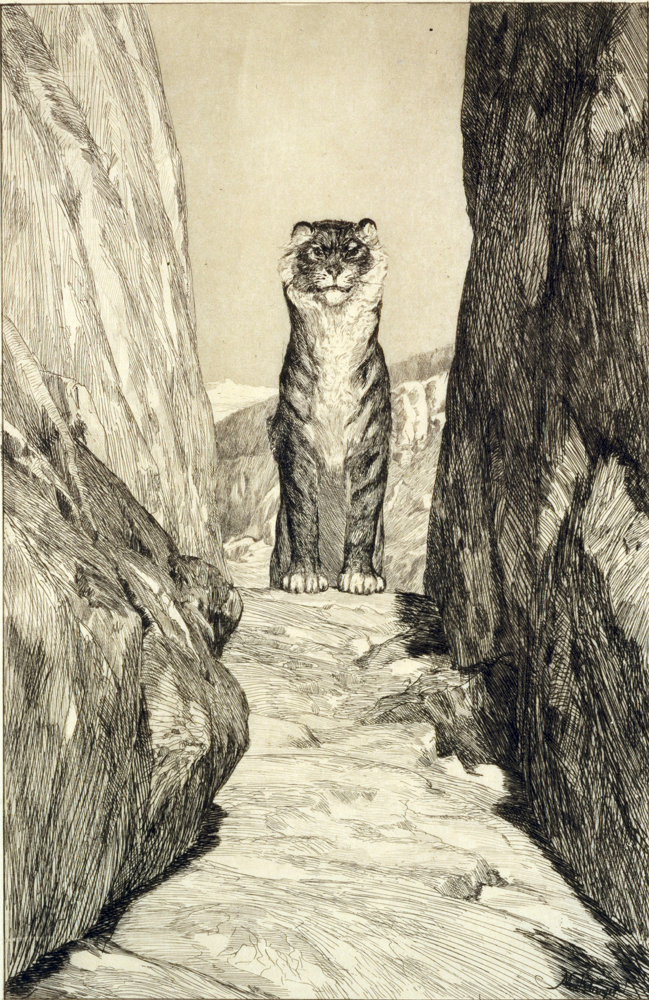
First Future, from the series Eva and the Future, Opus III, no, 2 (1879–80), etching with aquatint, 36 x 23.5 cm, Saint Louis Art Museum

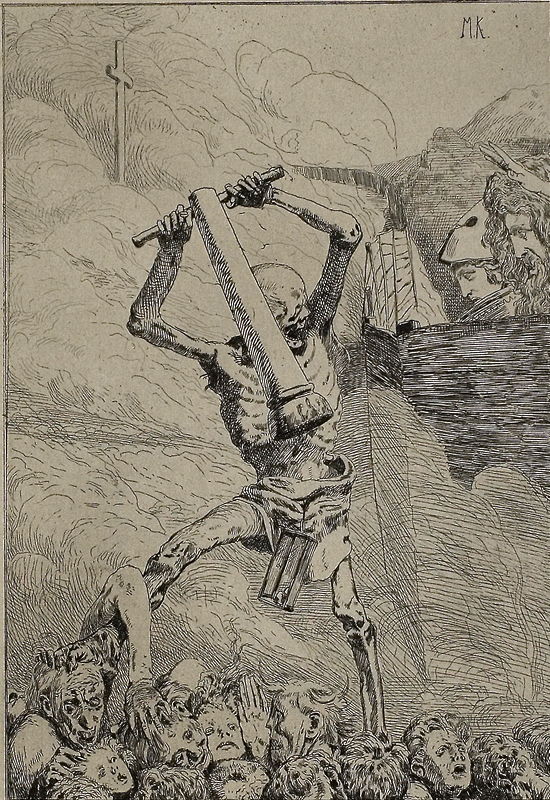
Third Future, from the series Eve and the Future, Opus III, no, 6 (1880), etching, 290 × 201 mm, Art Institute of Chicago, Gift of Jack Daulton

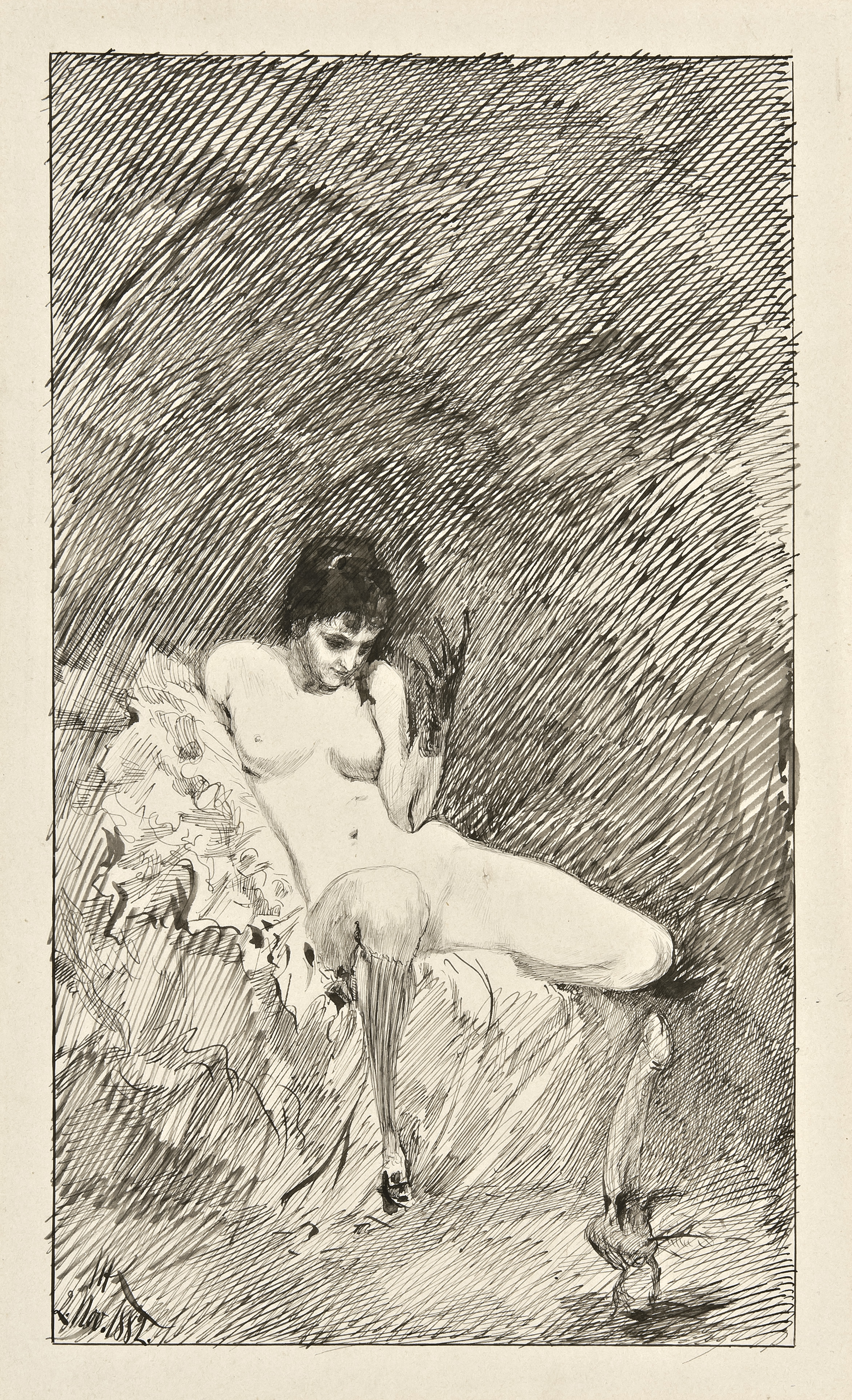
Sitting Naked Woman with Dancing Phallus (1882), ink pen and brush on paper, 30.6 x 18.7 cm

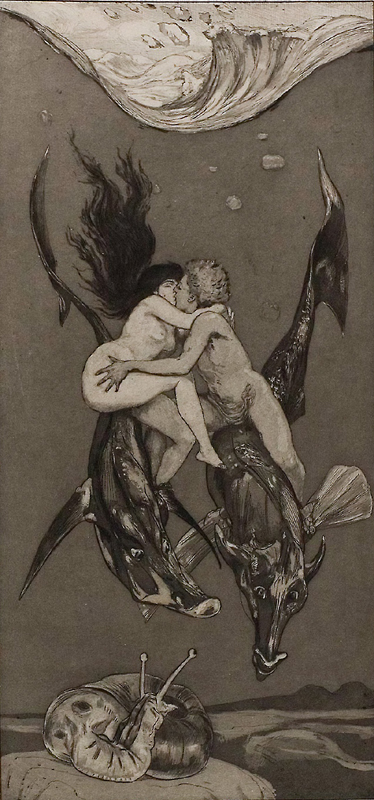
Temptation, from the series A Life, Opus VIII, no. 4 (1884), aquatint and etching, with roulette, 47.3 × 22.5 cm, Art Institute of Chicago

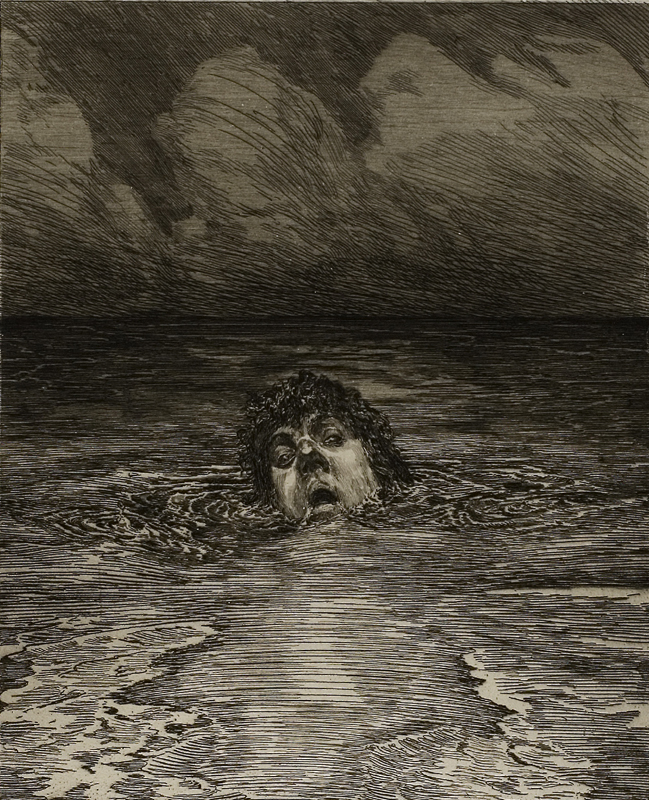
Downfall, from the series A Life, Opus VIII, no. 12 (1884), etching and drypoint, 27.6 × 22.8 cm, Art Institute of Chicago, Gift of Jack Daulton

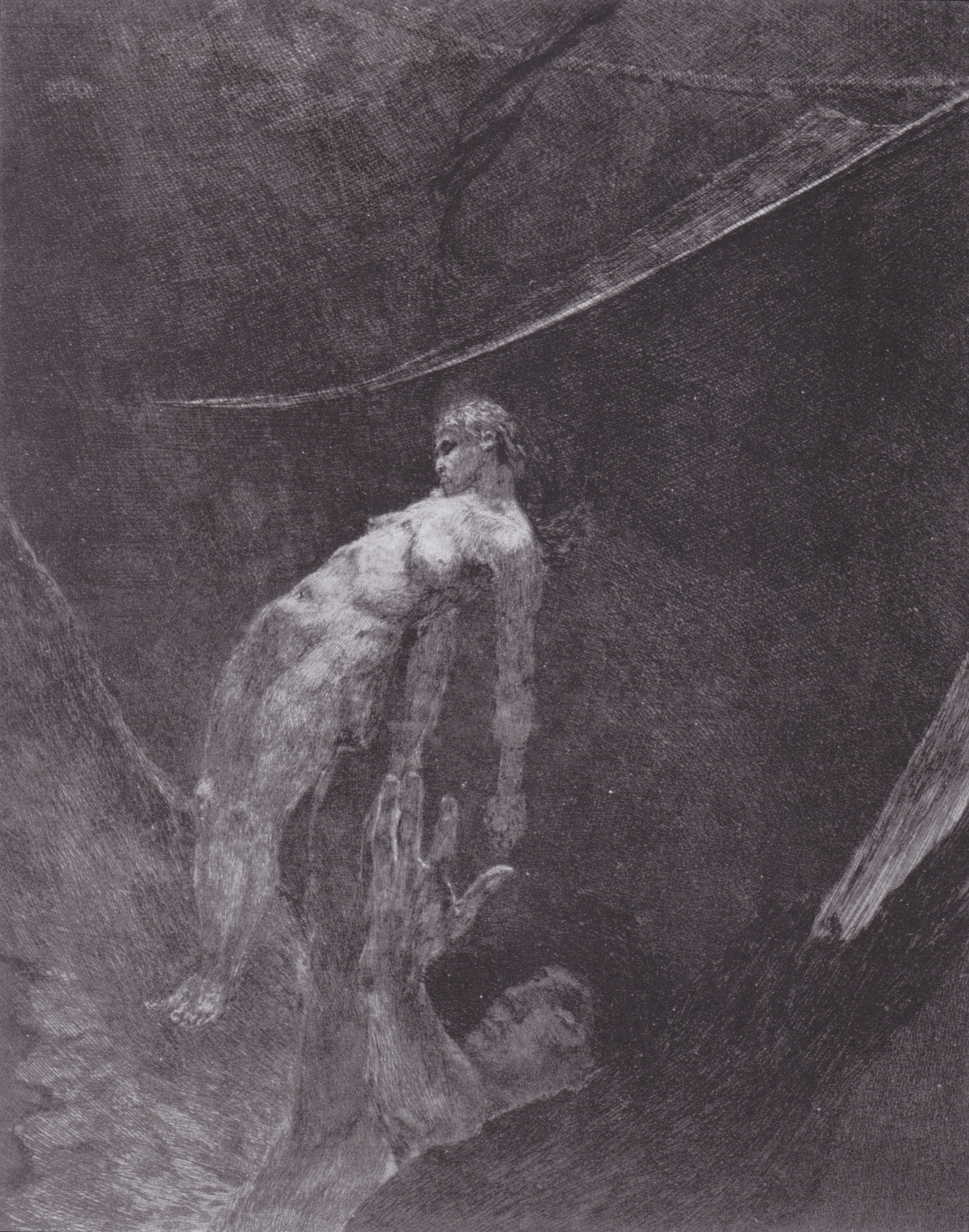
Back into Nothingness from the series A Life, Opus VIII, no. 15 (1884), etching and aquatint, 29.9 x 24.8 cm

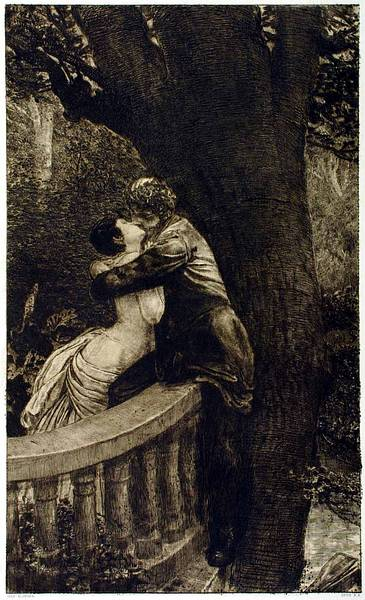
Kiss in the Park, from the series A Love, Opus X, no. 4 (1887), etching and engraving, 45.4 x 27.4 cm

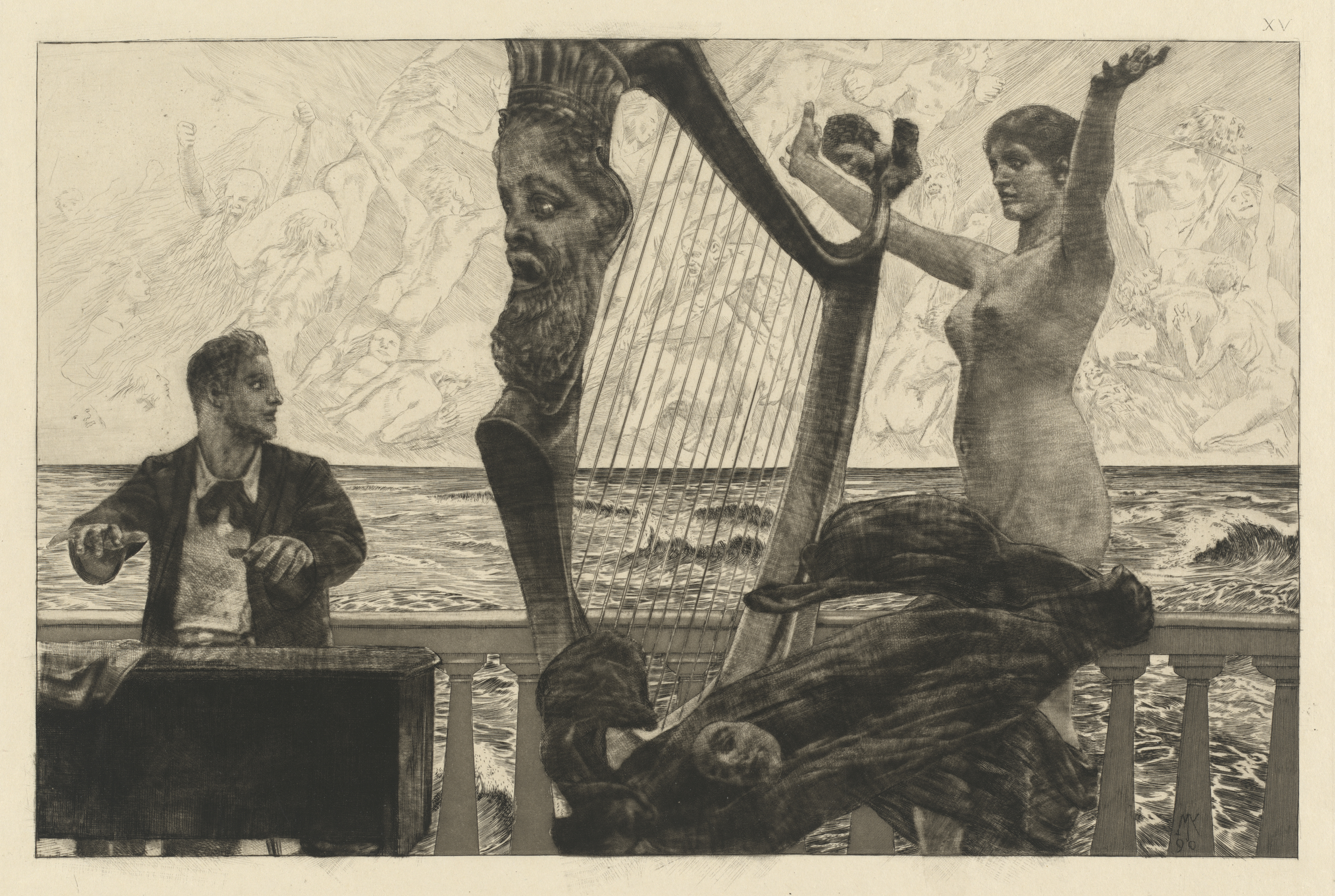
Evocation, from the series Brahmsphantasie, Opus XII, no, 2 (1894), 21.8 x 34 cm, National Gallery of Art, Washington D. C.

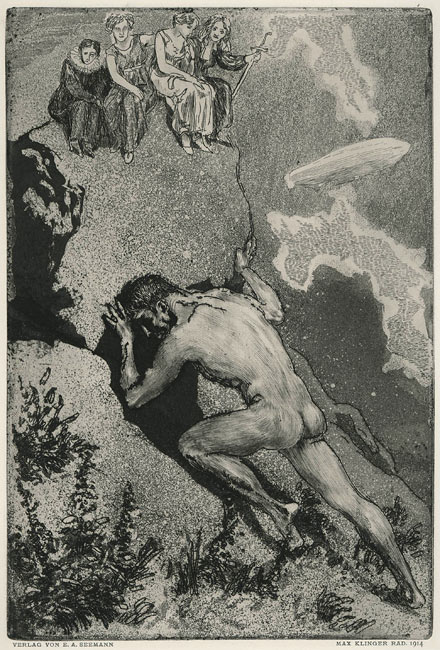
Sisifus (The Faculties) (1914)
