= Paraphrase on the Finding of a Glove =

Art series by Max Klinger

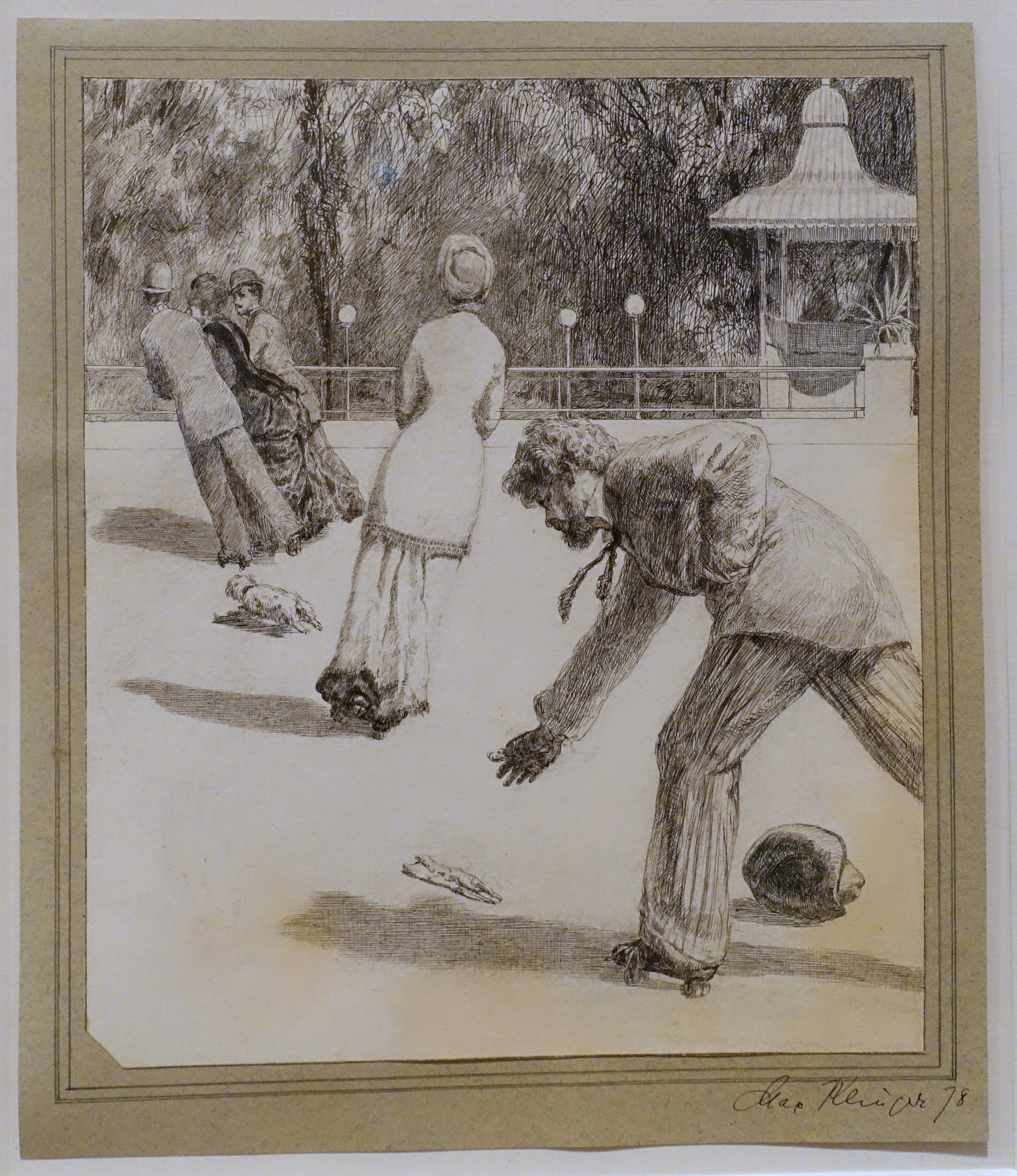
Handlung

Paraphrase über den Fund eines Handschuhs, often referred to in English as Paraphrase on the Finding of a Glove, is a set of ten etchings by Max Klinger. The series of prints were made by twenty-one-year-old Klinger in 1877-78 and first exhibited at the Berlin Art Association in 1878. They were later exhibited in a mixed technique of engraving, etching, and aquatint in 1881. The etchings are a part of the symbolism movement and hold a story of love, death, and fantasy, which Klinger is most known for.

The Paraphrase on the Finding of a Glove etchings are Klinger's first work of narrative sequence. He displays real and imaginary scenes that correspond through dreamlike understanding.

== Summary ==
The cycle of etchings begins at a skating rink in Berlin where Klinger himself is in the etching and admires a young woman. As the story goes on, people are skating and the young woman happens to drop her glove. Klinger swoops in to pick it up, losing his hat in the process. The glove becomes a fetish item and possesses a power over Klinger. Then the story starts to change into imaginative dimensions in which the intimate and potently sexualized object triggers a series of elaborate visions of longing and loss, conveyed through hallucinatory distortions of scale and jarring juxtapositions. The glove torments Klinger because he doesn't return it to the woman and keeps it to himself. Klinger gives the glove personality in the etchings. The glove will get away from Klinger multiple times in different scenes where he struggles to get it back. It also gives Klinger nightmares in the etching Anxieties, in the style of Goya. The glove eventually gets stolen from him in the night by a dreamlike creature in Abduction. In the last etching, Cupid, the viewer sees the glove lying on a table with Cupid sitting next to it.

This work of Symbolist art can have multiple meanings. One example is that the glove is a symbol of love and shows how it can be powerful and overwhelming. Also, Paraphrase on the Finding of a Glove is related to and predates Sigmund Freud's The Interpretation of Dreams.

Each etching is titled in German:

- Ort (Place) plate 1, 25,2 x 33,9 cm.
- Handlung (Action) plate 2, 29 x 19,6 cm.
- Wünsche (Yearnings) plate 3, 30,6 x 13 cm.
- Rettung (Rescue) plate 4, 23 x 16,7 cm.
- Triumph (Triumph) plate 5, 13,5 x 25,7 cm.
- Huldigung (Homage) plate 6, 15,3 x 32 cm.
- Ängste (Anxieties) plate 7, 13,5 x 25,7 cm.
- Ruhe (Repose) plate 8, 13,5 x 25,6 cm.
- Entführung (Abduction) plate 9, 11,4 x 26,1 cm.
- Amor (Cupid) plate 10, 13,5 x 26 cm.

== Gallery ==
Paraphrase on the Finding of a Glove, Opus VI

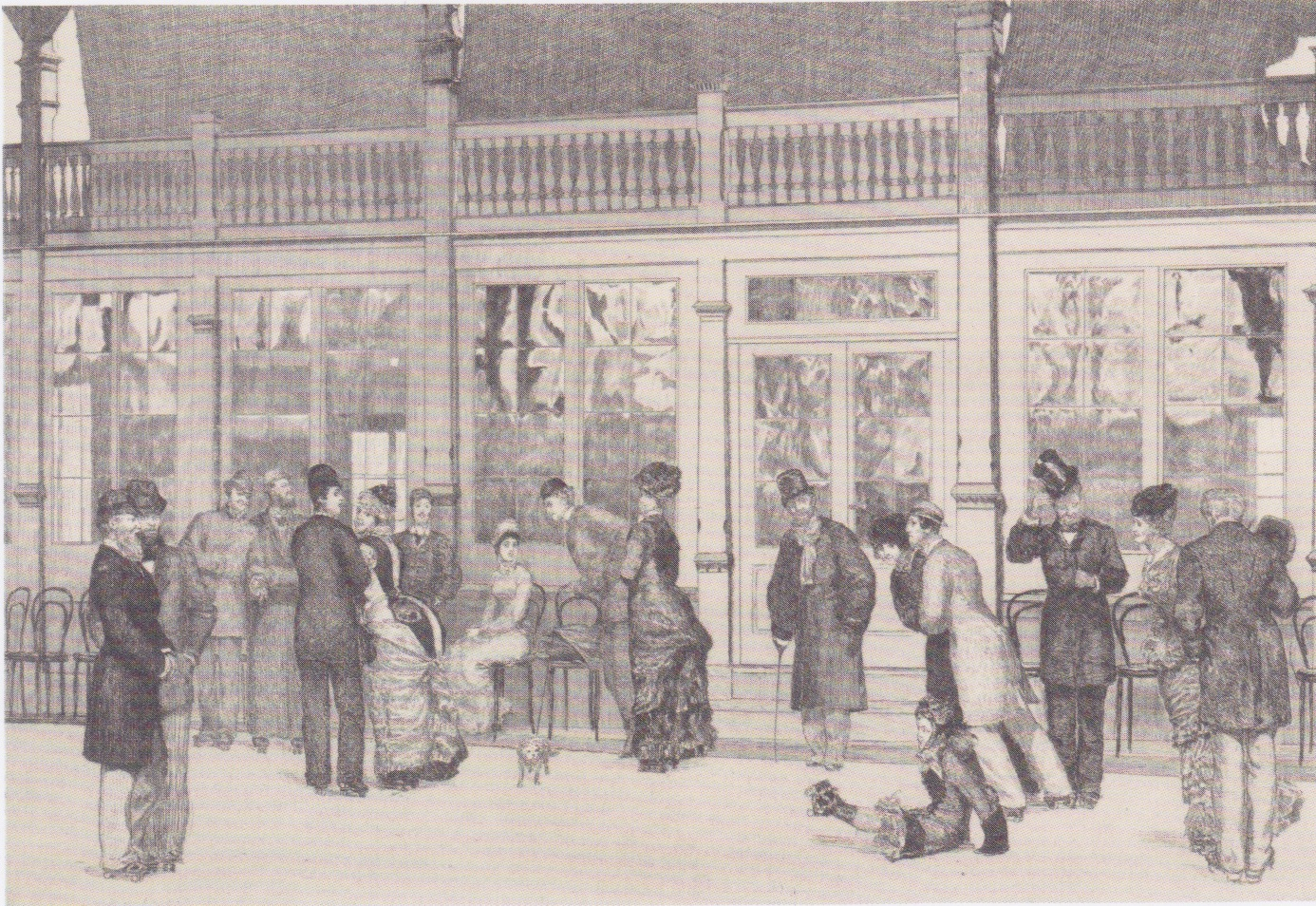
Place

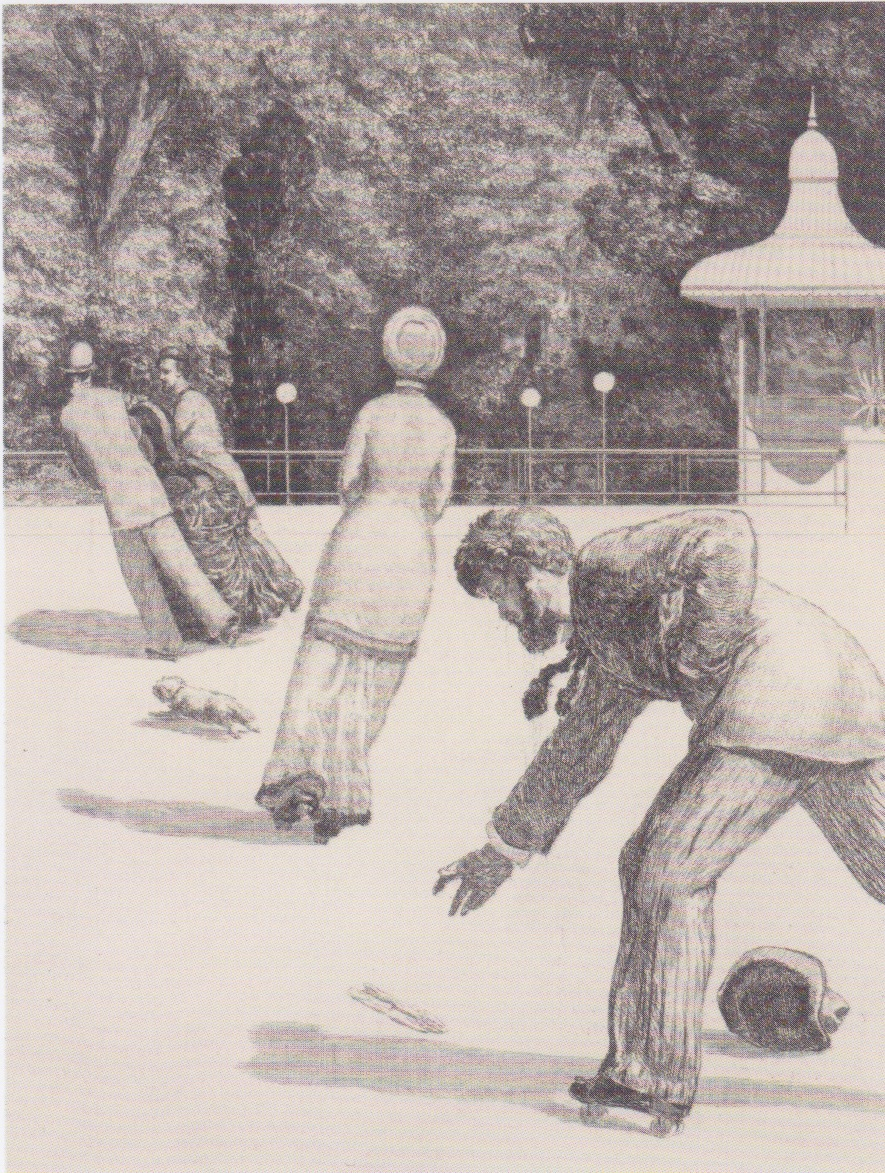
Action

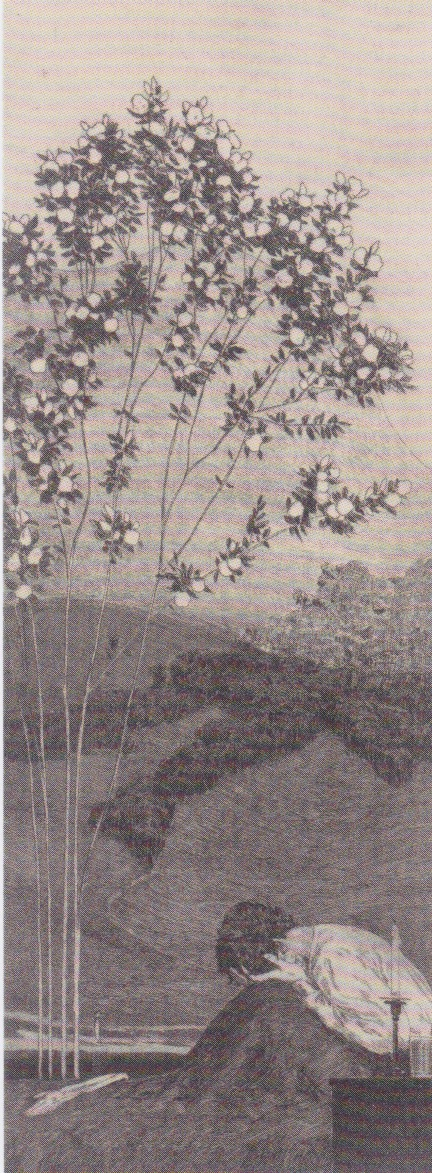
Yearnings

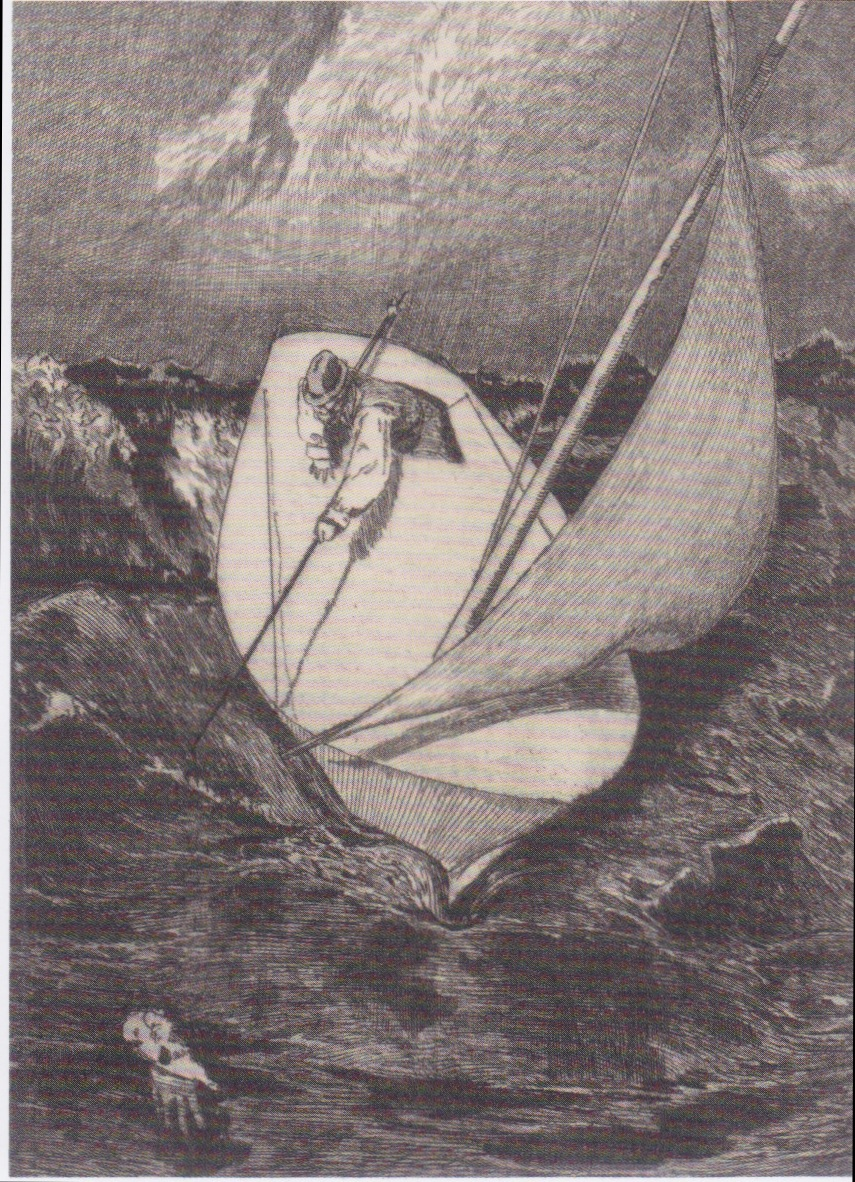
Rescue

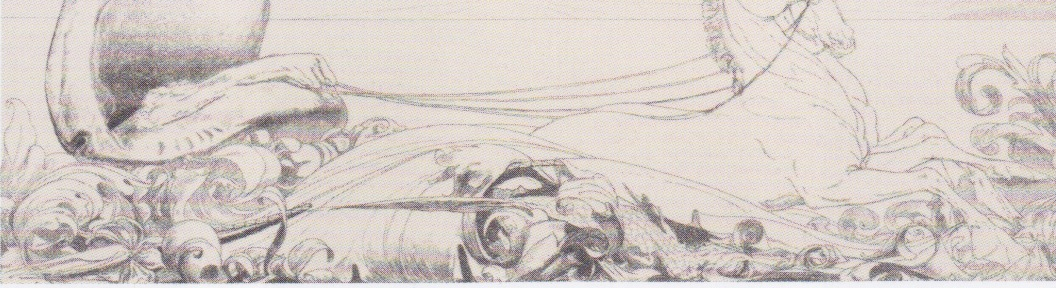
Triumph

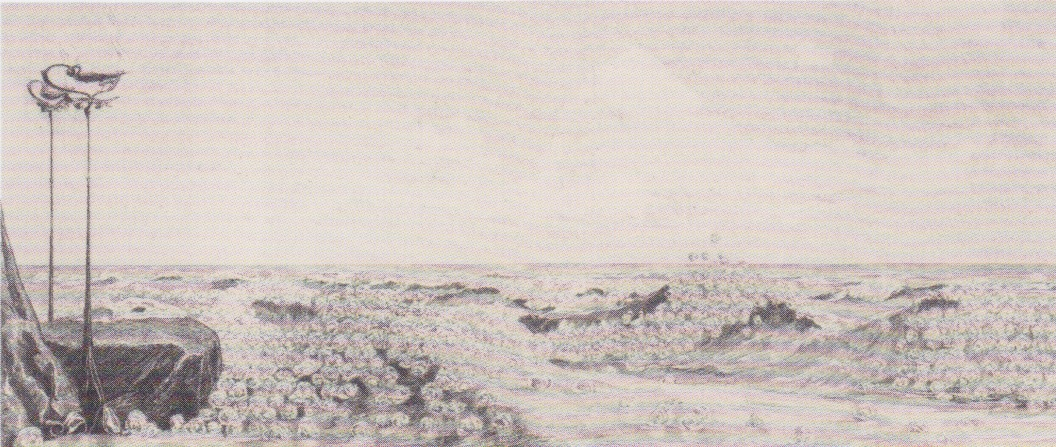
Homage

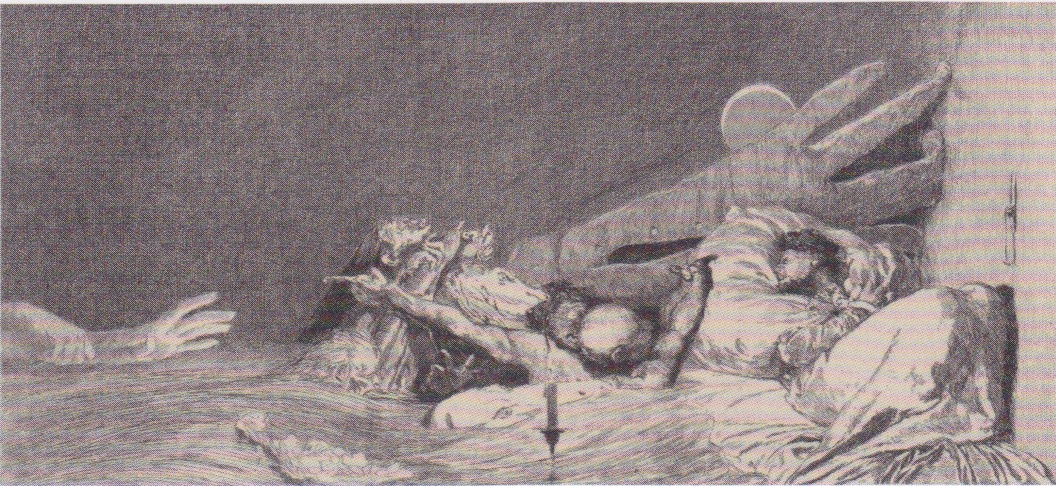
Anxieties

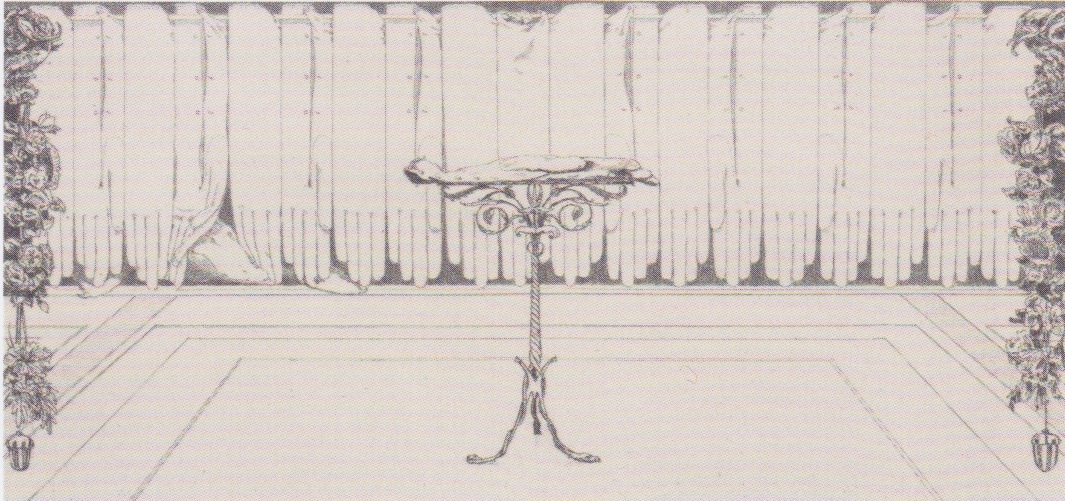
Repose

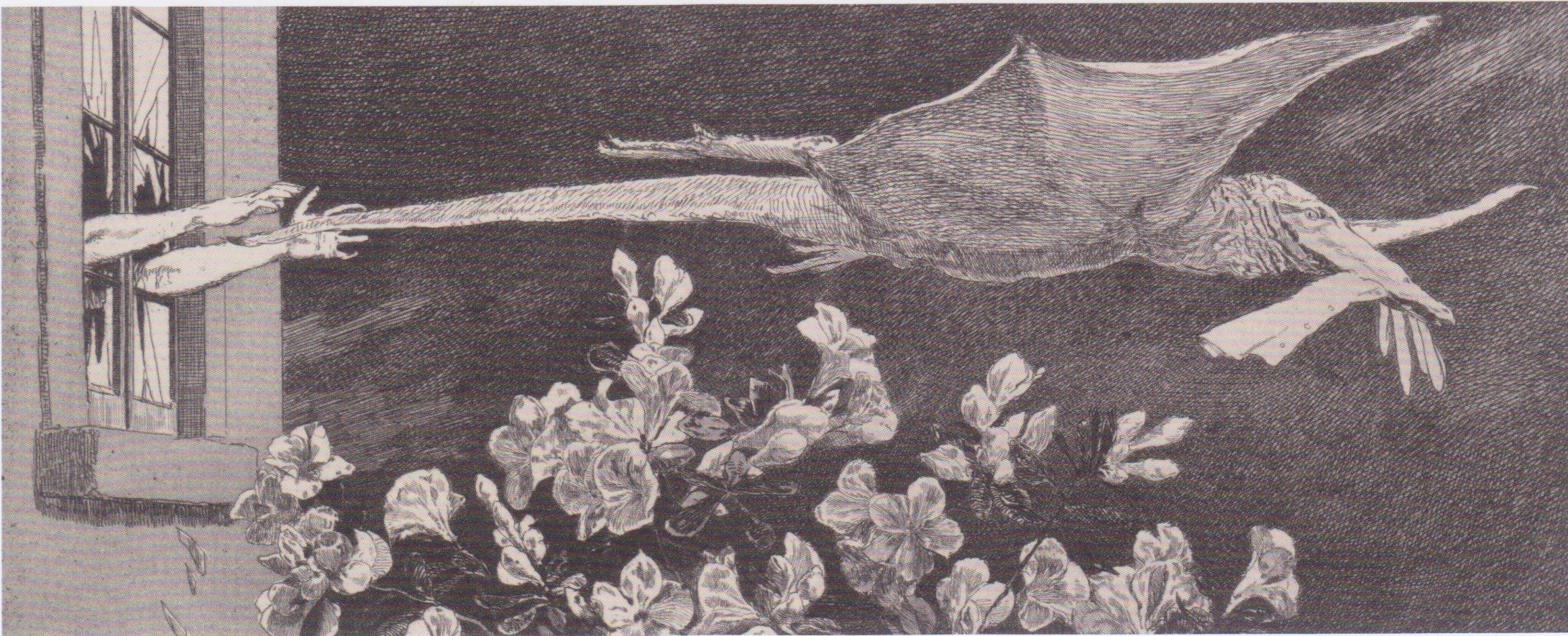
Abduction

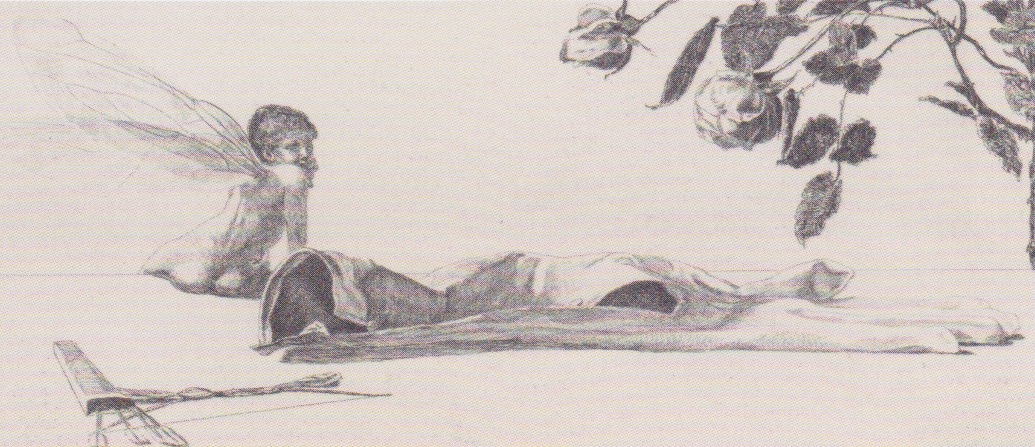
Cupid
