= The Prime of Greece =

Painting by Max Klinger

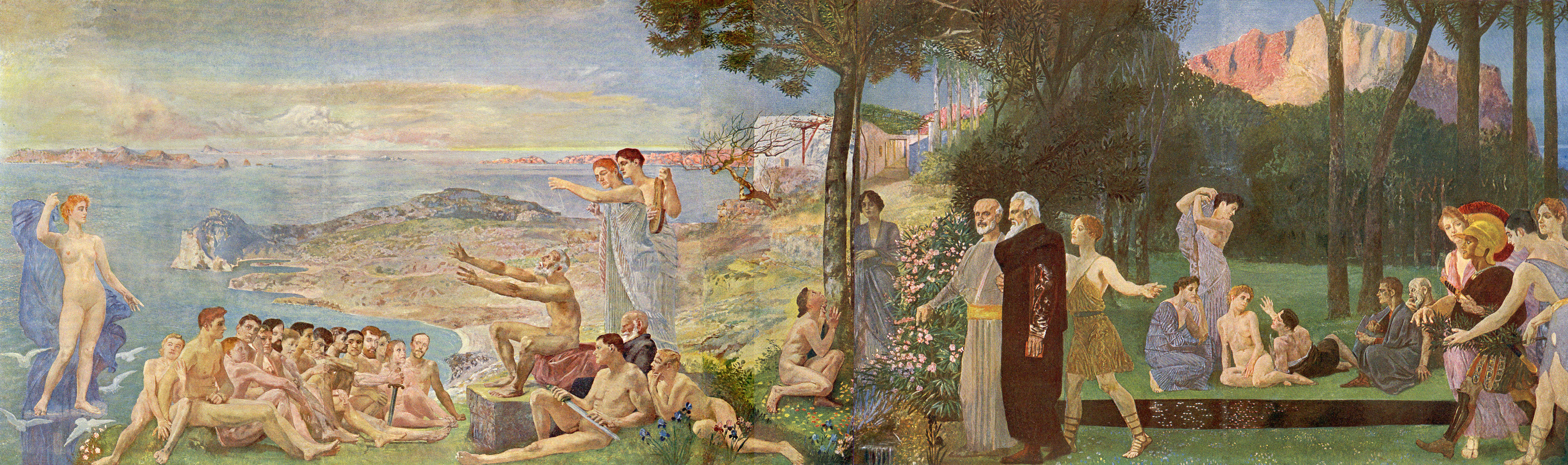
The Prime of Greece (Die Blüte Griechenlands) by Max Klinger, 1909

The Prime of Greece (in German: Die Blüte Griechenlands) was a painting by the German artist Max Klinger (1857–1920). The mural in the assembly hall of the Augusteum was presented to the public in 1909 as part of the celebrations for the 500th anniversary of the Leipzig University.

== History ==
The commission for the 6.15 by 20.30 metres (20.2 ft × 66.6 ft) canvas painting was related to the renovation and expansion of the university by Arwed Roßbach (1844–1902) on behalf of the Saxon state government, which donated the painting to the university as a gift. At 125 square metres (1,350 sq ft), it was Klinger's largest painting in terms of area. In 1909, Paul Schumann (1855–1927) published about the painting for the first time. It was received with unusually unanimous positive reviews by critics.

Klinger received the commission for the painting in 1906 based on a scaled color design. In the actual painting, he deviated considerably from the design in some parts. The Saxon Ministry of Culture had withdrawn a commission that had already been given to Klinger in early October 1905 because he had repeatedly put them off, and suggested Hermann Prell (1854–1922) as an alternative. Otto Greiner (1869–1916) was also asked in May 1906, but declined because he was in Rome. Klinger did submit the color design in 1906, which the University Senate Commission accepted. This meant that Klinger got the withdrawn commission for the mural back. He completed the work on time in 1909.

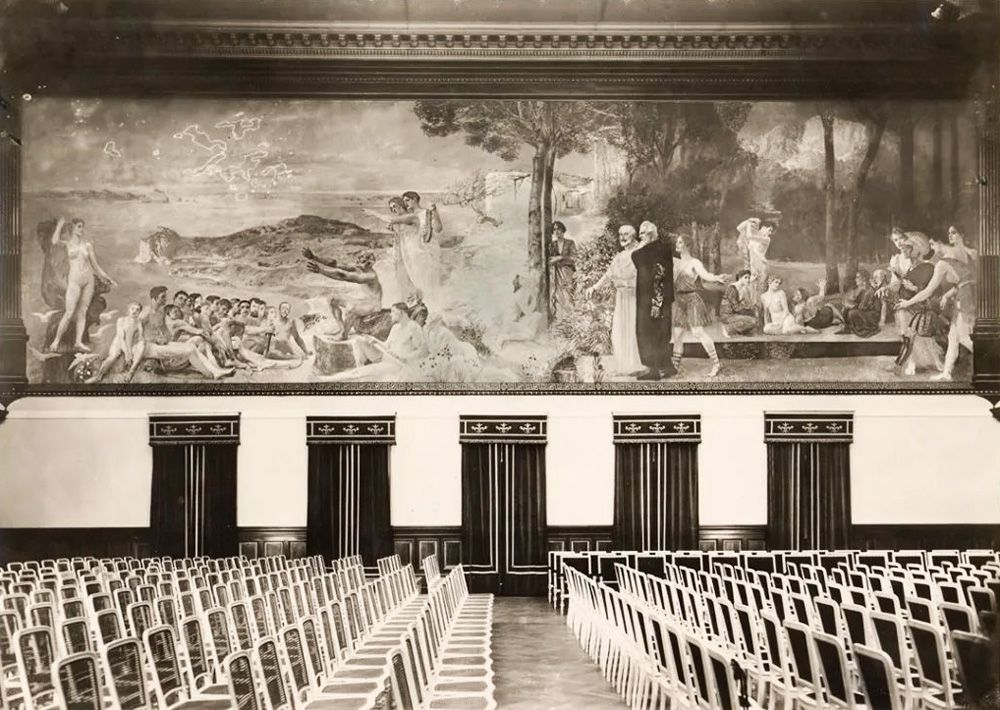
The painting in its original place in the assemby hall of the Augusteum, around 1920

In the air raid on 3-4 December 1943, many buildings, including this painting, were lost. The painting was "completely" burned and eventually disappeared from collective memory. To counteract this, a special exhibition was held in 2021 (dedicated to the year of Max Klinger's death in 1920) under the title: Max Klinger and the Leipzig University: The Lost Assemby Hall Painting in Context. An accompanying volume was published which, for the first time, presents the creation process of this painting in a conceptual context. This painting is unthinkable without the significant substantive contribution of classical antiquity, in particular classical archaeology. Franz Studniczka (1860–1929), with whom Klinger himself was also friends, played an important role here. For example, Studniczka played a key role in ensuring that the Leipzig University Senate Commission voted unanimously in favour of Klinger's design in May, thereby advocating for the resumption of the commission to Klinger, who had been stripped of the contract in the meantime. However, the psychologist Wilhelm Wundt (1832–1920), the historian Karl Lamprecht (1856–1915), the chemist Wilhelm Ostwald (1853–1932) and the art historian August Schmarsow (1853–1936) should also be mentioned here. The exhibition included design sketches and drafts by Klinger, among others. In terms of content, it also means reflecting on the humanistic traditions of ancient Greece in an archaeologically influenced theme and at the same time adopting a holistic perspective. Klinger's monumental painting was not about depicting reality, but about achieving an effect on the viewer. It is about the symbolic representation of universal education. And the German Bildungsbürgertum around 1900 considered classical Greek culture to be exemplary.

Friedrich Schinkel (1781–1841) also painted a painting named Blick in Griechenlands Blüte. This too has been lost in the war since 1945. Schinkel is connected to Leipzig University through his Schinkel Gate, among other things.

When Wilhelm von Kaulbach (1805–1874) was commissioned by Frederick William IV of Prussia (1795–1861) in 1845 to depict the entire history of the world in six large murals for the Neues Museum in Berlin, one of his motifs was also entitled Die Blüte Griechenlands.

== Description ==
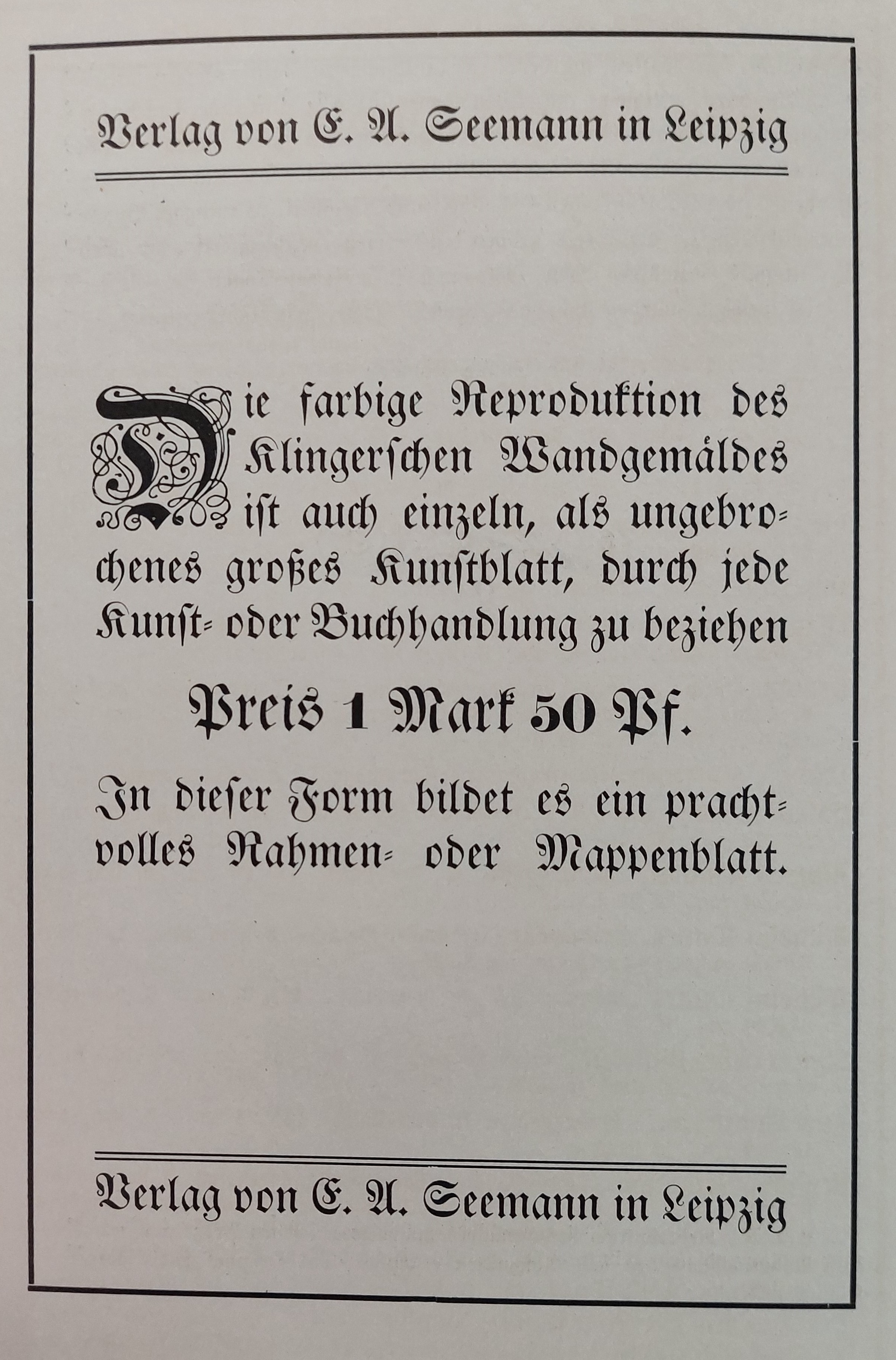
Publisher's advertisement for a reproduction (1909)

Despite the destruction in 1943, numerous photographs give us a good idea of what it once looked like. However, no certain information can be given about the painting technique. On the one hand, there is information that Klinger painted it in oil, while he himself stated in letters that he experimented with tempera and watercolor paints and, according to his own statement, switched from brush painting to palette knife. The painting is dominated by larger-than-life figures. The entire cycle is divided into two parts. The right-hand part of the picture shows a forest landscape and a steeply rising rocky landscape. The choice of colors is darker than in the left part. In the foreground, a small stream runs through the meadow. At the outer edge of the picture, Alexander the Great appears with a helmet, accompanied by three Amazons. The group of figures in between cannot be precisely interpreted. The philosophers Plato and Aristotle are walking on the front strip of meadow. These in turn also form the transition to the left half of the picture. The landscape here is an idealized bay of the Aegean Sea with a gathering of people. Among other things, it depicts a stylized audience listening to a speaker accompanied by a lute and triangle player. The speaker is the blind poet Homer, sitting on a stone pedestal. He gesticulates wildly with his hands raised to the sky and his gaze directed towards it. On the left edge of the picture, the goddess of love Aphrodite floats over an abyss, unnoticed by the group of listeners.

Despite all the symbolism of the picture, two people from Klinger's environment can be clearly identified. The female figure leaning alone against the tree in the middle of the picture is Klinger's partner Elsa Asenijeff (1867–1941), and the man on the far right in Homer's audience is the painter and graphic artist Otto Greiner (1869–1916), who lived in Munich and Leipzig and with whom Klinger had been friends since their meeting in Italy. The surviving pastel preparatory drawing of Otto Greiner for the painting is owned by the Jack Daulton Collection in Los Altos Hills, California. In the group of figures sitting opposite the gesticulating Homer, the fourth person from the right, a red-haired man with a beard, is a quote from an early self-portrait by Klinger from 1891, which is in dialogue with the Elsa Asenjieff depicted.

== Bibliography ==
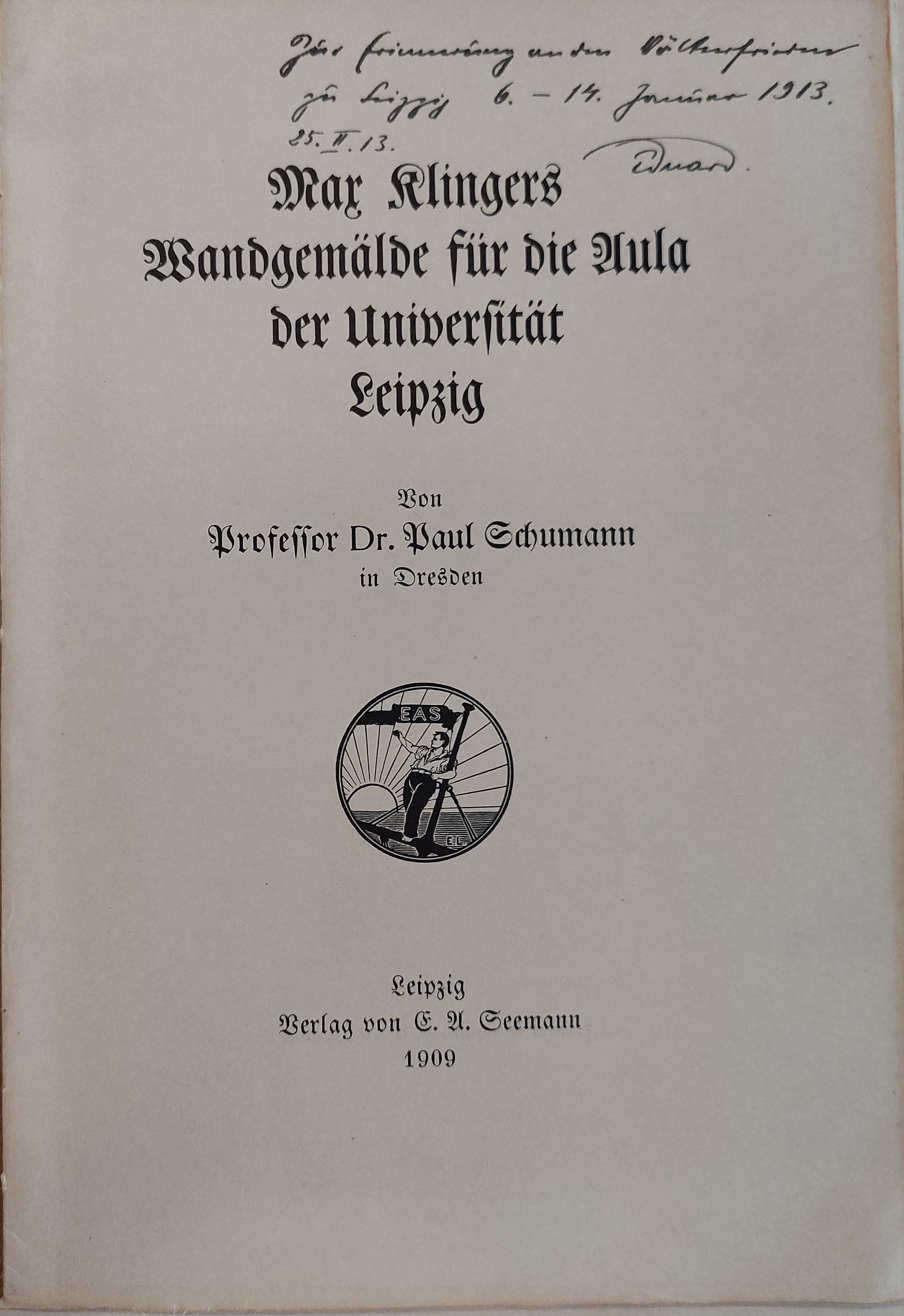
Paul Schumann (1909)

=== In German language ===
- Conny Dietrich: „Gebt mir eine Wand“. Max Klingers öffentliche Wandmalereiprojekte. Ein Beitrag zur Monumentalmalerei im deutschen Kaiserreich. Mit einem Katalog der Vorarbeiten (Skizzen, Studien, Kartonfragmente), Wissenschaftliche Beiträge aus dem Tectum Verlag: Kunstgeschichte, Band 13, Tectum Verlag, Baden-Baden 2020. ISBN 978-3-8288-4394-3
- Rudolf Hiller von Gaertringen, Conny Dietrich (Hrsg.): Max Klinger und die Universität Leipzig: Das verlorene Aulawandbild im Kontext, Passage-Verlag, Leipzig 2021. ISBN 978-3-95415-111-0
- Paul Schumann: Max Klingers Wandgemälde für die Aula der Universität Leipzig, Verlag von E. A. Seemann, Leipzig 1909, (Digitalisat)
