= Paulinerkirche, Leipzig =

Coordinates: 51°20′20″N 12°22′48″E

Paulinerkirche
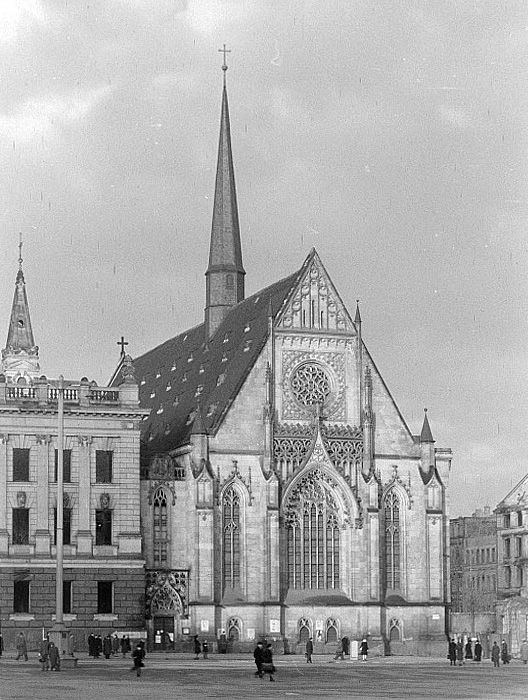
- The Paulinerkirche, the university church of Leipzig, view from the Augustusplatz, 1948, facade by Arwed Roßbach
- Paulinerkirche
- Location: Leipzig
- Country: Germany
- Denomination: Lutheran
- Previous denomination: Roman Catholic

History
- Dedication: St. Paul

Architecture
- Style: Gothic
- Groundbreaking: 1229
- Completed: 1231
- Demolished: 30 May 1968

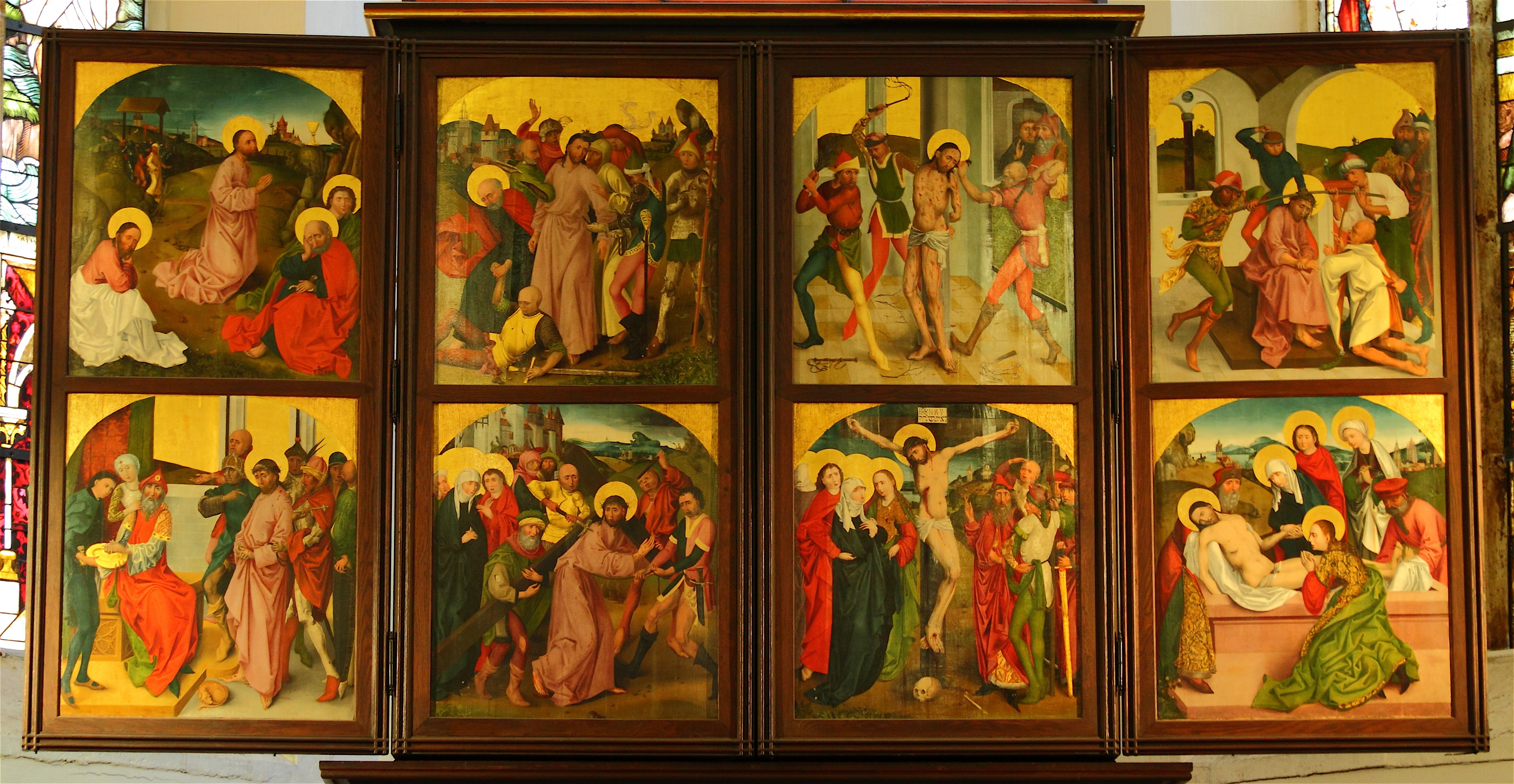
Paulineraltar, the back side

The Paulinerkirche was a church on the Augustusplatz in Leipzig. It was built in 1231 as the Klosterkirche St. Pauli for the Dominican monastery in Leipzig. From the foundation of the University of Leipzig in 1409, it served as the university church. After the Protestant Reformation it was donated to the university and was inaugurated in 1545 by Martin Luther as the Universitätskirche St. Pauli (University Church of St Paul), later also called Unikirche. Johann Sebastian Bach was director of music for "festal" (holiday) services in 1723−25.

The church survived the war practically unscathed but was dynamited in 1968 during the communist regime of East Germany. After the reunification of Germany, it was decided to build a new university church on the site in the shape of the former church. A new building, the Paulinum (formally: "Aula und Universitätskirche St. Pauli", i.e. "Assembly Hall and University Church St. Paul"), was built on the site beginning in 2007.

== History ==
=== Dominican Abbey ===
In 1229, friars of the Dominican Order settled in Leipzig and started building the Paulinerkirche in 1231 as their abbey church, within the city walls close to the Grimma Gate. It was built in the typical fashion of a church of a Mendicant order of the 13th century, with a choir and a nave with two aisles in the "Langhaus". The church was consecrated in 1240 by archbishop Wilbrand from Magdeburg to St. Paul. The church was part of a larger complex of medieval buildings which together formed the Dominican monastery of Leipzig.

=== University Church ===
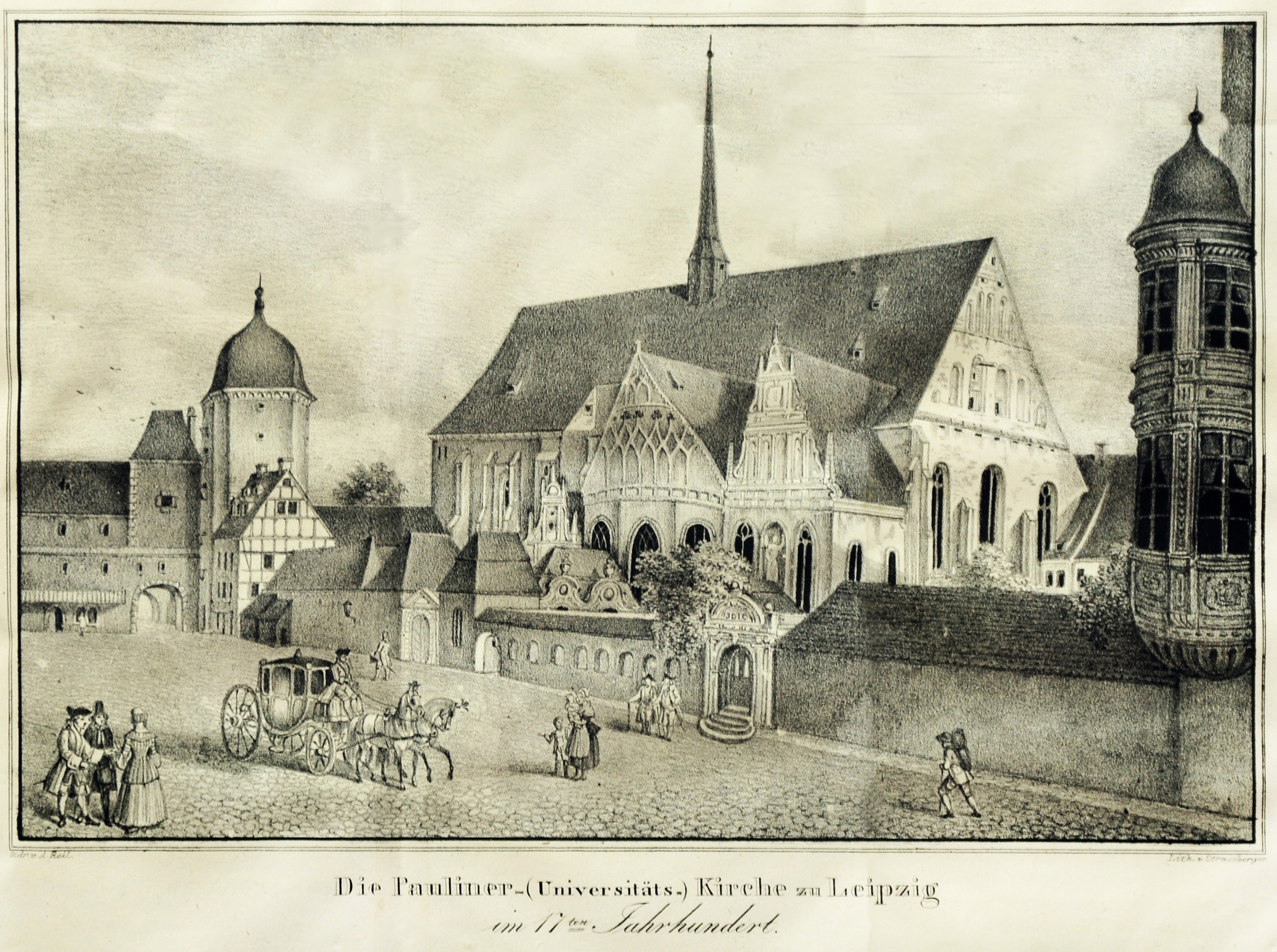
The Paulinerkirche in the 17th century, lithograph by Ernst Wilhelm Straßberger, ca. 1839

Since the foundation of the University of Leipzig in 1409, the church was closely related to the university. A tradition of "Universitätsgottesdienst" (university service) started then, with preachers appointed by the university since 1419. The altar from the 15th century is now in the Thomaskirche. Several faculty members of the university and their relatives were buried in the church, commemorated on epitaphs of artistic value, people such as Johann Christoph Marci (law), Christian Friedrich Franckenstein (historian) and Benedikt Carpzov (1595-1666, law), whose epitaph was restored in 2011. Johann Tetzel, a Dominican preacher famous for selling indulgences, was buried in 1519.

After the Protestant Reformation the order was dissolved, and on 22 April 1544 Moritz von Sachsen signed the donation of the former monastery (i.e. the church and the adjunct monastery buildings) to the university. The Paulinerkirche was inaugurated as a Protestant university church by Martin Luther on 12 August 1545. Luther's sermon on this occasion is extant in his handwriting, the so-called Zerbster Handschrift ("Eine predigt || D. Martini || Lutheri, newlich zu Leip= || tzig gethan. || Wittemberg. || Durch Hans Lufft. || 1545."), printed in Nuremberg in 1545 ("Ein nütze Lehr, unnd || schöne vermanung, || Wie Gott durch das H. Euangeli= || on uns heimgesuchet, unnd wir || uns dagegen halten sollen. || Gepredigt zu Leipzig, || durch || D. M. Luther || M.D.XLV. ... Gedruckt zu Nürm= berg durch Johan vom Berg, || und Ulrich Newber, wonhafft auff dem Newen= || baw bey der Kalckhütten. Anno 1545.), and printed in Leipzig in 1817 when the church was reopened after the Battle of Leipzig.

The church was used for services and, from 1543 to 1768, also as Aula, an auditorium for academic functions. Samuel Rüling was music director in Leipzig, also for the Paulinerkirche, from 1610 to 1612, when he moved on to the Kreuzkirche in Dresden. Werner Fabricius was the first "Director musices Paulini" (director of music of St Paul) from 1656 to 1679. He was succeeded by Johann Schelle (1679–1701) and Johann Kuhnau (1701–1722). An organ at the western wall was first heard on 2 November 1679. In 1717 the new organ by Johann Scheibe was inspected by Johann Sebastian Bach in his function as an organ consultant. Johann Gottlieb Görner was the organist from 1717. His comment was: "nicht gnugsam rühmen und loben können, sonderlich deren Raren Register" ([he could] not praise enough, especially its unusual stops).

When Bach was cantor in Leipzig from 1723, he also performed "festal" (holiday) services at the Paulinerkirche in 1723-25, while Görner was director for regular Sunday services. Bach possibly performed a new cantata already for Pentecost, Wer mich liebet, der wird mein Wort halten, BWV 59, on 16 May 1723, before he began his tenure as cantor at the Thomaskirche and the Nikolaikirche two weeks later, Sunday after Trinity. On 17 October 1727 Bach performed the funeral ode Laß, Fürstin, laß noch einen Strahl, BWV 198, requested by the university to mark the death of Christiane Eberhardine, the wife of August II the Strong. Bach performed his motet Der Geist hilft unser Schwachheit auf, BWV 226, first on 21 October 1729 in a memorial service for Johann Heinrich Ernesti (1652-1729), rector of the Thomasschule. Probably in 1733, Bach performed his cantatas Laßt uns sorgen, laßt uns wachen, BWV 213 (Hercules at the Crossroads), for the birthday of the heir to the throne of the elector, and Tönet, ihr Pauken! Erschallet, Trompeten! BWV 214, for the birthday of the queen, a cantata which he used as a model for parts of his Christmas Oratorio, namely its opening chorus. Probably in 1735 Bach performed the homage cantata Die Freude reget sich, BWV 36b, to Johann Florens Rivinius on his appointment to the Rectorship of the university in October 1735.

In 1778 Johann Adam Hiller was appointed music director and served until 1785.

=== 19th century ===
During the Battle of Leipzig in 1813, the church served as a camp for hostages and a military hospital. In the 19th century most of the remaining buildings of the monastery were demolished and replaced by the Augusteum, built from 1831 to 1836. The church had originally faced the city walls, which were torn down in 1785. The church faced the new representative square, later called Augustusplatz. Therefore Albert Geutebrück erected in 1836 a Neoclassical facade, replaced by a Neo-Gothic facade of Arwed Roßbach in 1897.

Felix Mendelssohn conducted his oratorio on the church's patron saint, Paulus, in the first performance in Leipzig on 16 March 1837. The composer's funeral was held in the church on 7 November 1847. In 1907 Max Reger was appointed music director of the university.

=== Gallery ===
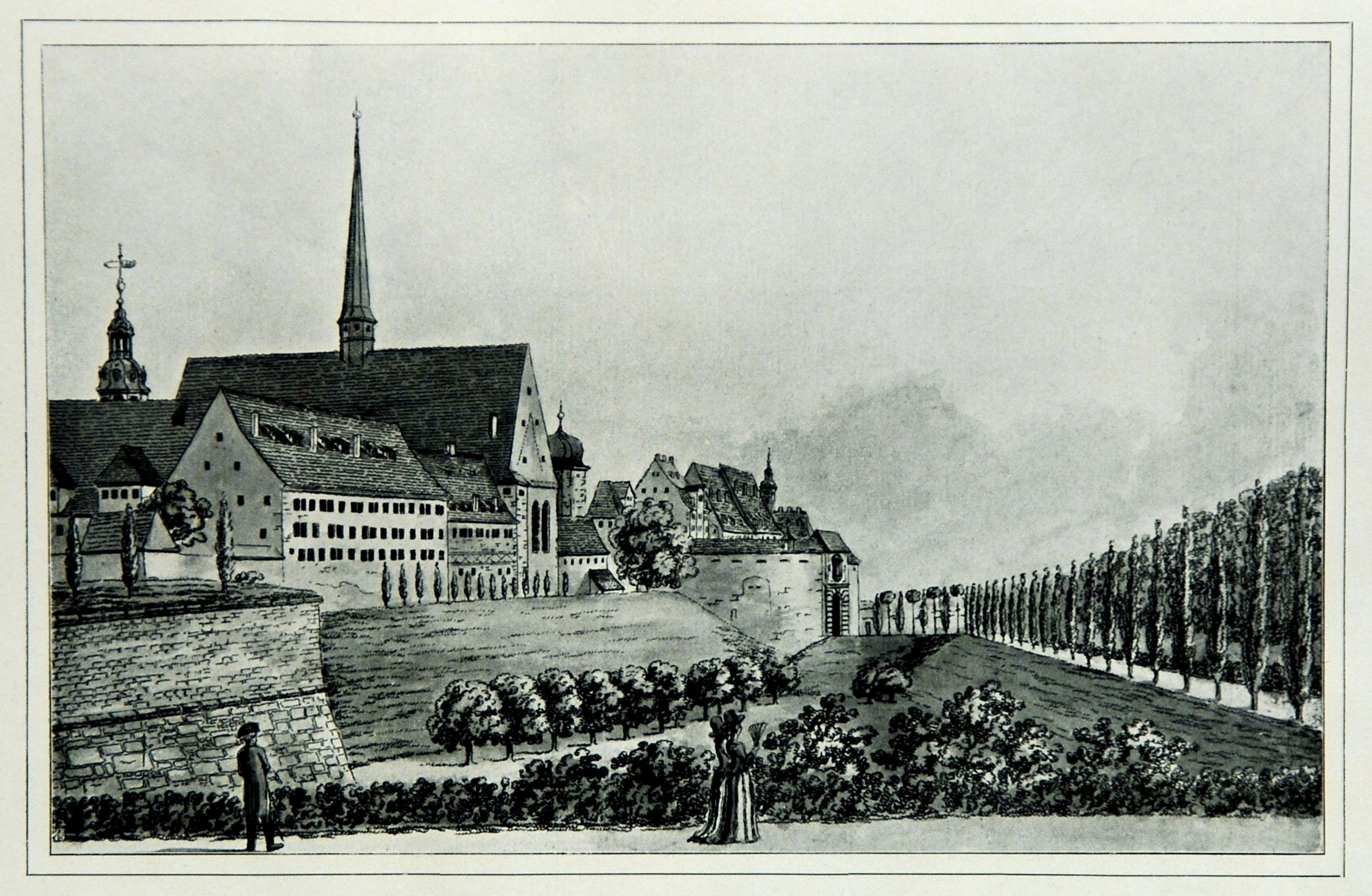
University and its church, c. 1800

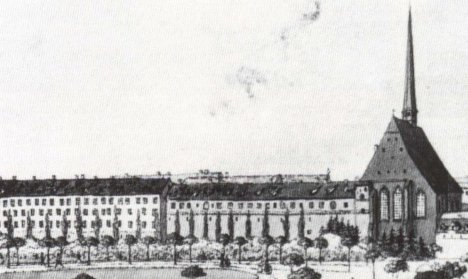
From the east before 1830

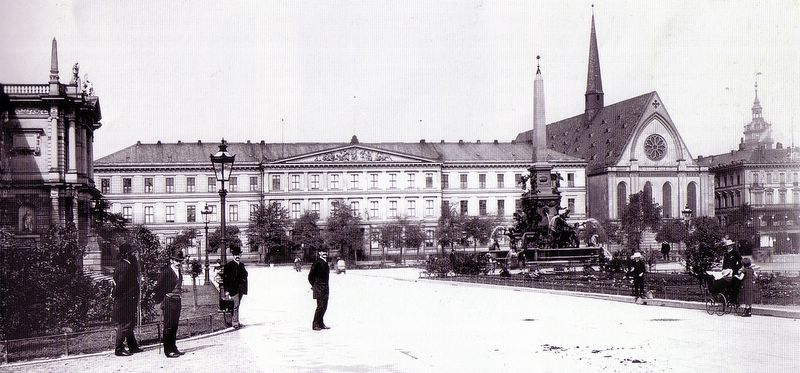
c. 1890, with the Augusteum on the left

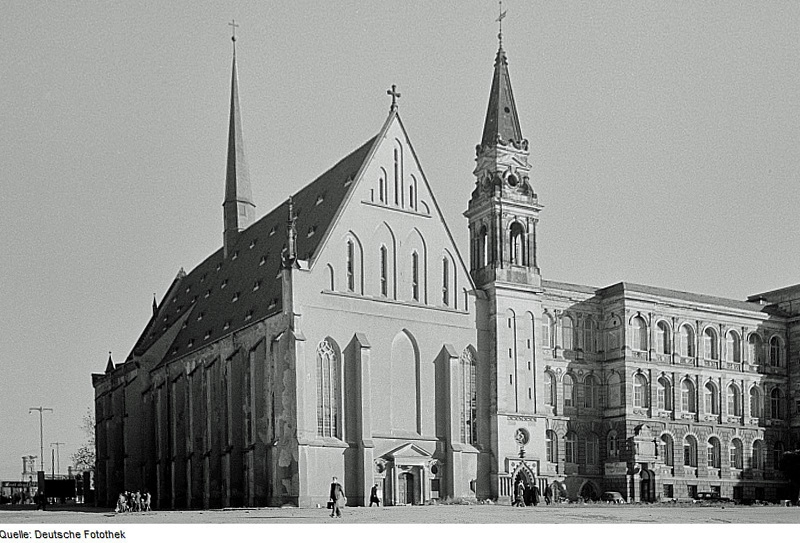
From the west, 1951

=== Destruction in 1968 ===
On 30 May 1968, under the communist regime, and after a decision by the SED-led city administration and the university administration, the Paulinerkirche was dynamited to make way for a redevelopment of the university, eventually carried out between 1973 and 1978. The church had survived the war practically unscathed, unlike the Augusteum next to it.

The decision to demolish the church was met with widespread opposition, from students, locals, religious leaders, conservationists, and even members of the ruling party, among whom were the culture minister of East Germany from 1961 to 1966, Hans Bentzien, and Volkskammer President Johannes Dieckmann.

Protestors against the blasting operation were arrested. One such protestor, Nikolaus Krause, a theology student, was sentenced to 22 months in prison for "defamation of the state and organising a petition". The organ could not be saved; the organist was playing whilst the first holes for explosives were being drilled. A smaller chamber organ was however rescued.

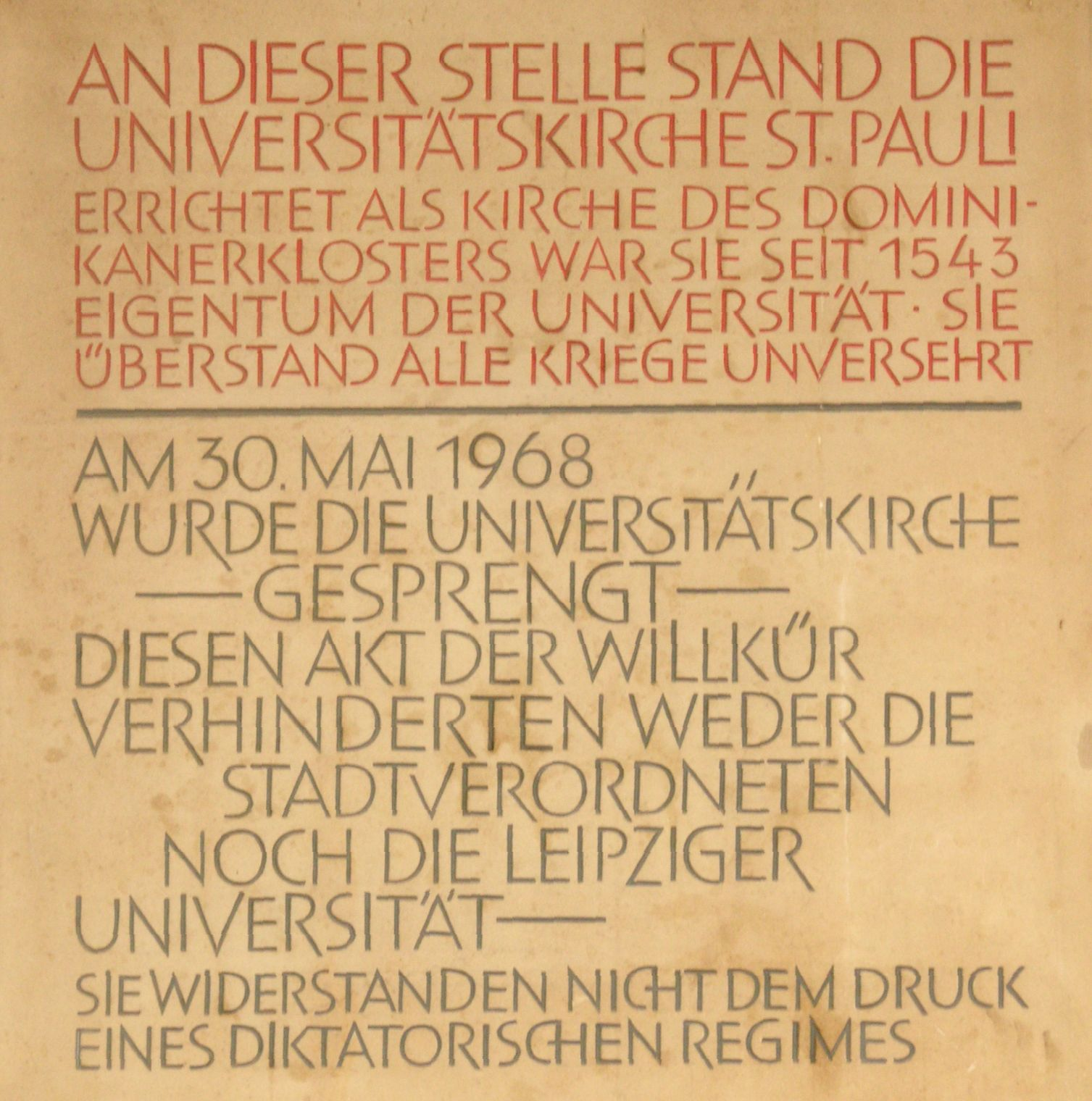
Plaque on the site of the church, noting its destruction

On 4 April 1968 the Leipziger Universitätschor performed Bach's St Matthew Passion, conducted by Hans-Joachim Rotzsch. The last service was held in the packed-out church on 23 May 1968. Two days later, two churchwardens were allowed inside to remove sheet music and liturgical ornaments.

A plaque at the site was unveiled 25 years later, on 30 May 1993. An A-frame sculpture in the dimensions and at the location of the former facade at the Augustusplatz was a memorial.

The Paulineraltar, the Gothic altar, was rescued and temporarily installed at the Thomaskirche. It was moved to the new church (see below) in 2014.

=== Rebuilding debate ===
Calls for reconstruction have persisted since its demolition. Three weeks after the Paulinerkirche was dynamited, a banner was unfurled on stage picturing the church and stating "1968: Wir forden Wiederaufbau" ("1968: We demand reconstruction") during the International Bach Competition in Leipzig.

These calls intensified following German reunification. Among the people calling for a faithful reconstruction was Nobel Prize-winning biologist Günter Blobel, who argued:

This is much more than a church — this is a shrine of German cultural history, connected to the most important names in German cultural history.

=== New university church ===
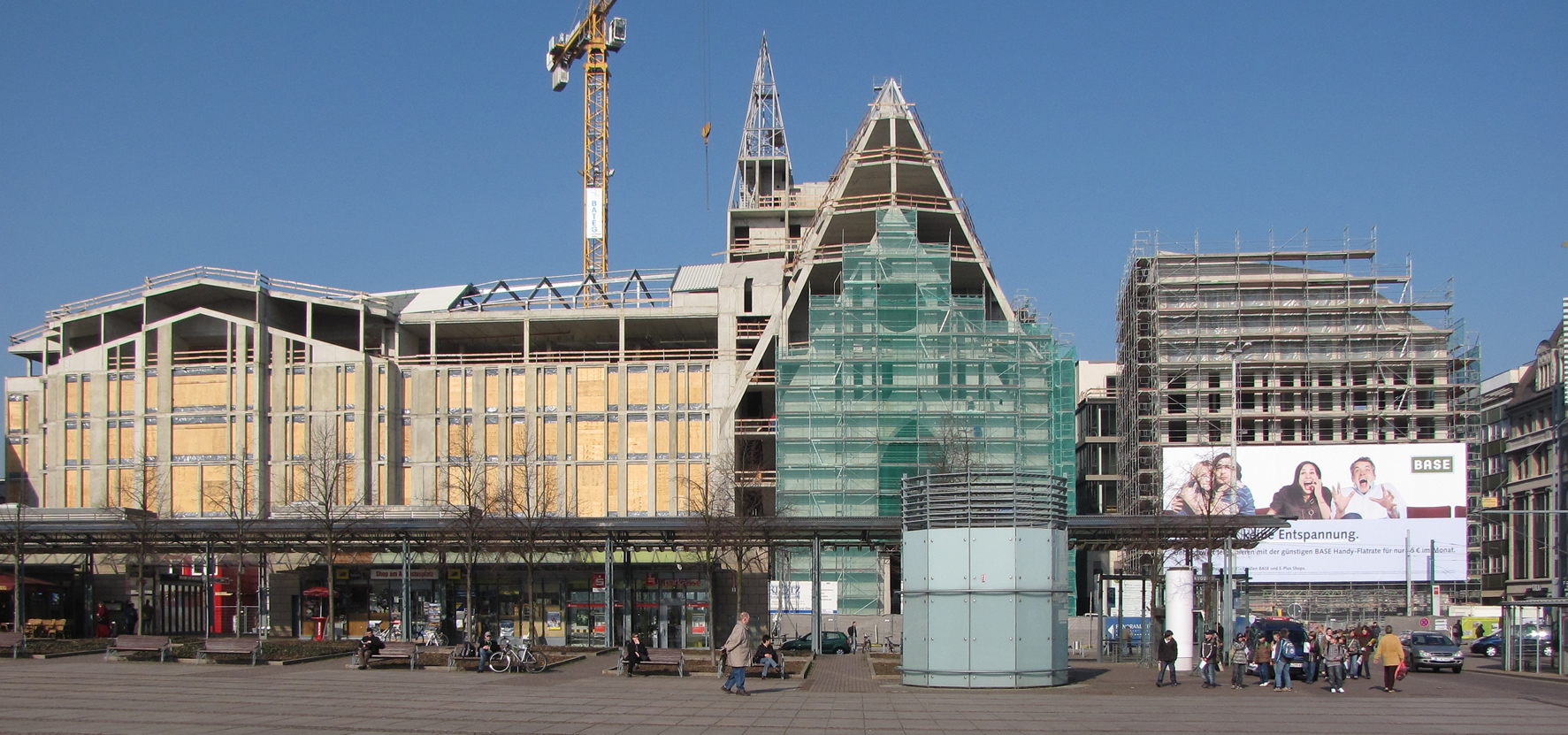
Construction of the new Paulinum, 2009

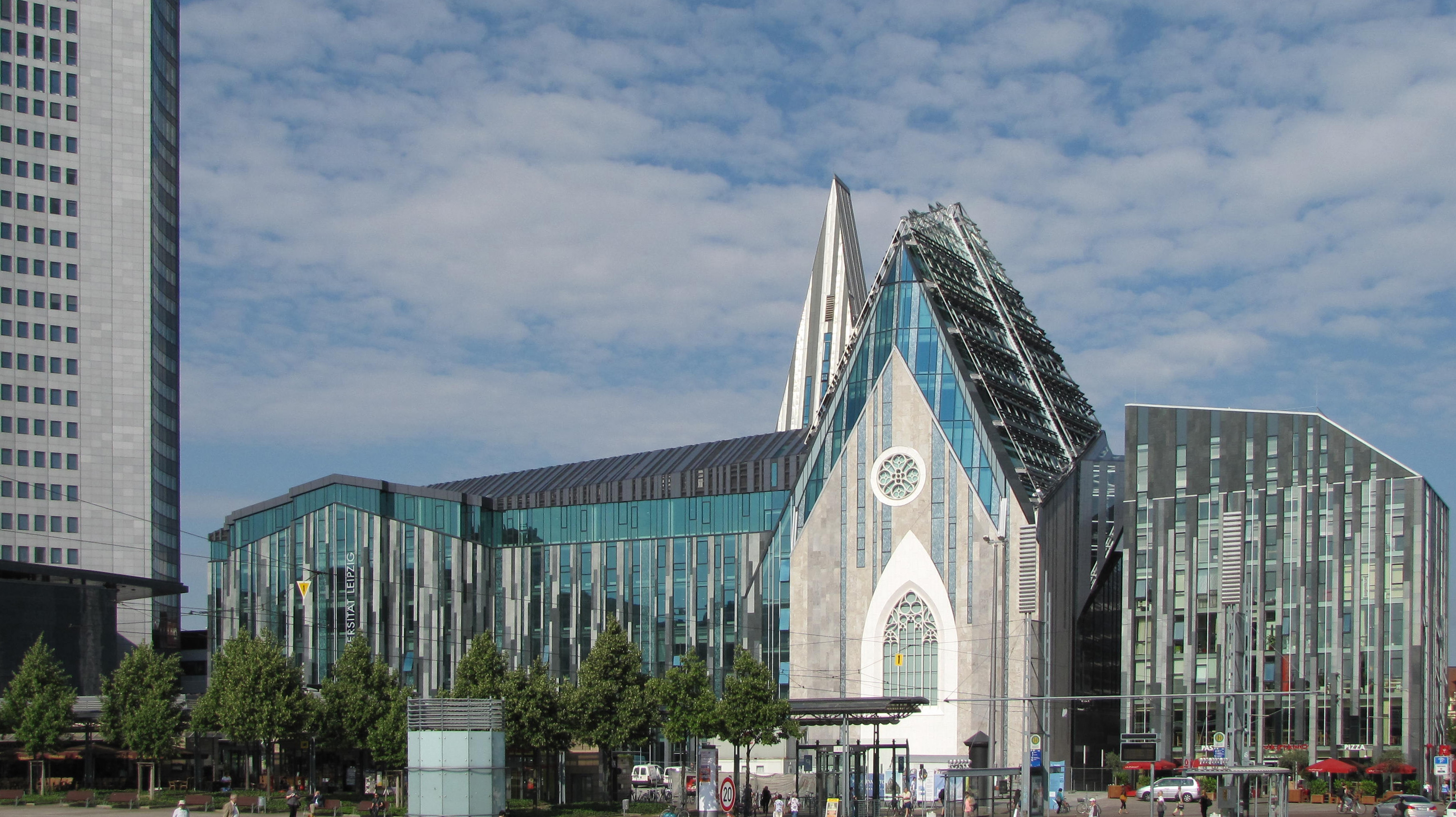
Paulinum in 2012

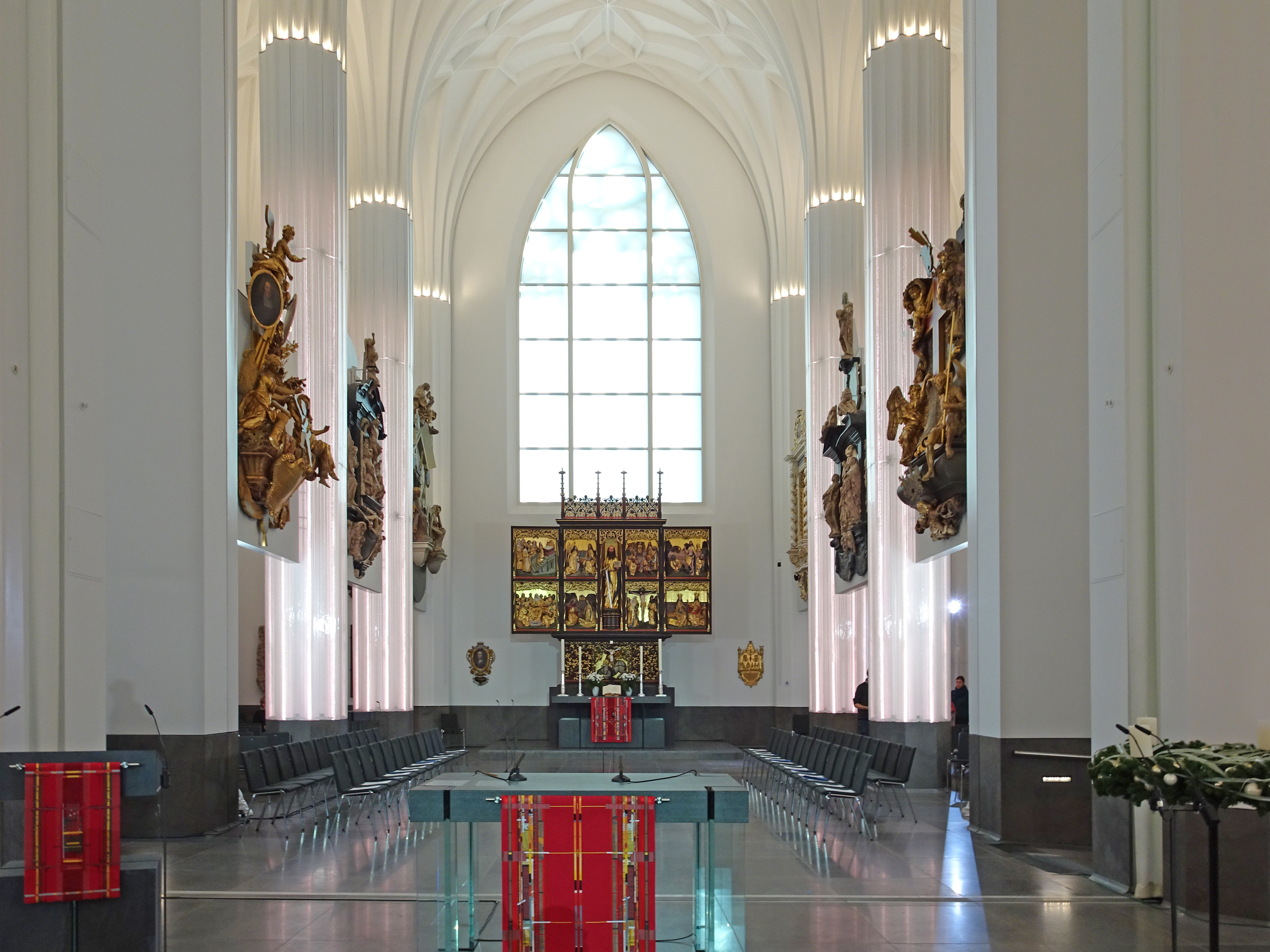
View of the prayer room, with historical figures and objects, on the day of the inauguration, 3 December 2017

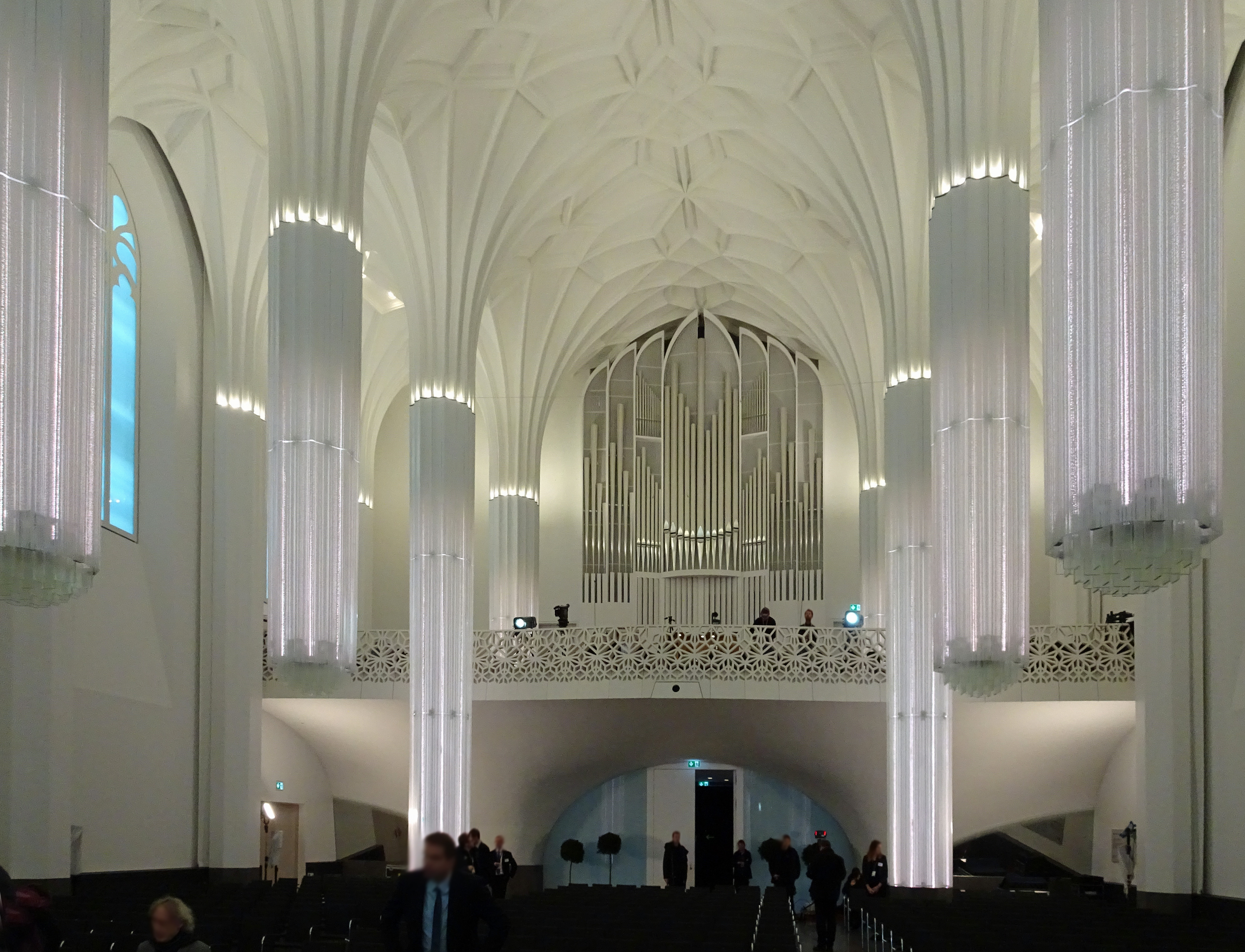
View from the choir to the assembly hall

The new buildings at the university's main campus are inspired by the form and shape of the old church. The newly built heart of the university includes a room for common prayer and regular religious services, located exactly at the place of the former church. The whole complex has a double function as a church (using the historical name Universitätskirche St. Pauli - University Church St. Paul) and as an assembly hall (Aula). The short name for the whole building with both functions is Paulinum. The first service in the new church was held on 6 December 2009 (the second Sunday in Advent), and it included a performance of Bach's cantata Nun komm, der Heiden Heiland, BWV 61.
