= Schinkel Gate =

Entrance at the University of Leipzig in Germany

Coordinates: 51.338579°N 12.378670°E

The Schinkel Gate (2014)
- Das Schinkeltor (German)
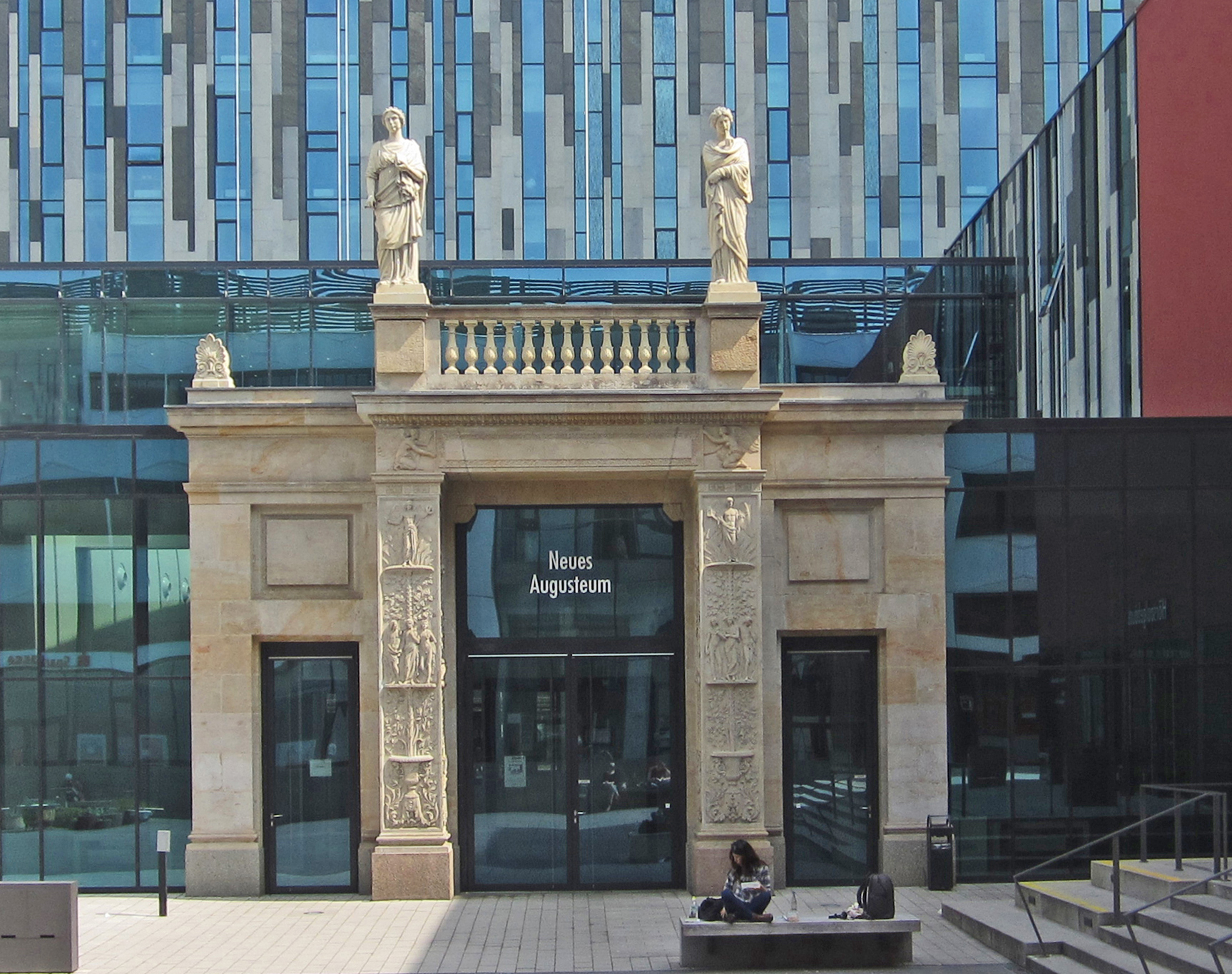
- Artist: Karl Friedrich Schinkel
- Year: 1836
- Medium: Cotta sandstone
- Location: University of Leipzig, Leipzig, Germany

The Schinkel Gate at the west entrance to the New Augusteum of the University of Leipzig is the only surviving building fragment of the university complex on Augustusplatz in Leipzig, Germany, from the 19th century. It is named after the Prussian architect Karl Friedrich Schinkel (1781–1841). It is a listed building.

== Description ==
The Schinkel Gate is a three-part portal made of sandstone, in which the unadorned side parts, which were added later to the original work, have rectangular blind areas above the door openings. Their cornice is adapted to that of the central part.

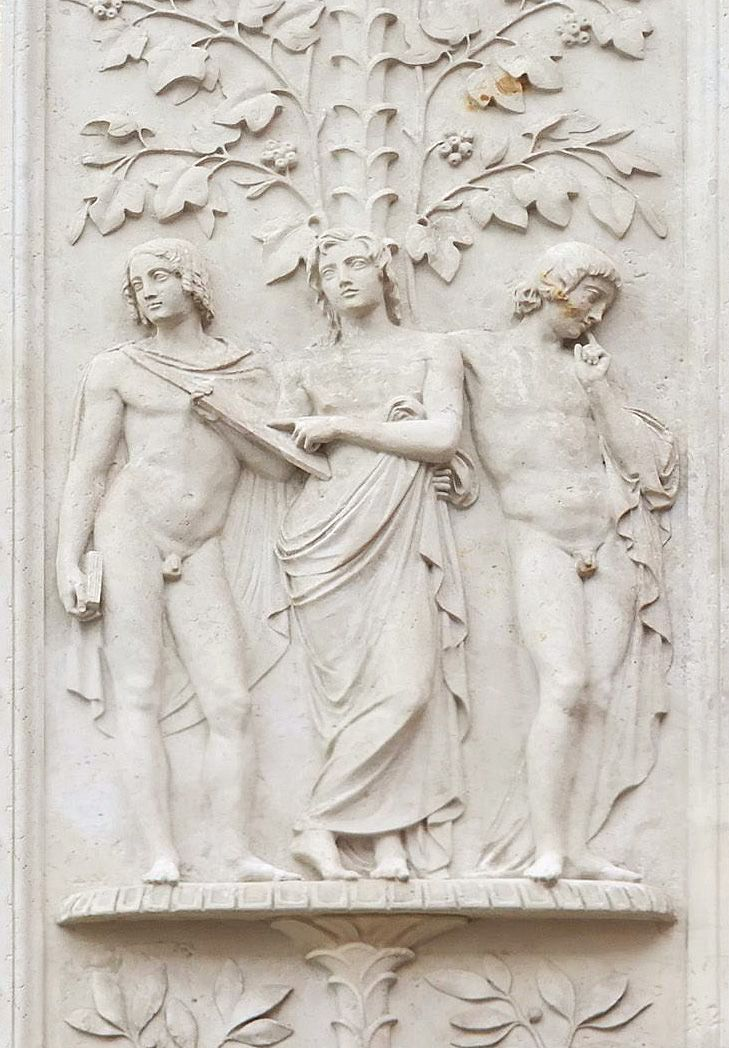
Detail from the right pilaster

The prominent central section is a classically proportioned splayed opening frame with pillar-like pilasters and a straight lintel. The pilasters are richly decorated in relief. Acanthus tendrils with fruit and birds fill the sides and the lower parts of the front surfaces. In the upper front parts, youthful figures are depicted in thinking and writing poses and in speaking gestures, embodying science and art. Above them, on the left side, floats the genius of fame with a laurel wreath and palm branch, and on the right that of immortality with an hourglass and cornucopia.

The middle section has a balustrade, on the sides of which stand the muses Calliope and Polyhymnia. Calliope, on the left, the Greek muse of poetry, philosophy and rhetoric, carries her attributes of a writing tablet and stylus. Polyhymnia, as the muse of hymn poetry, pantomime and also geometry, is considered serious and thoughtful, which is expressed by her pose with her finger in front of her mouth. Below the cornice, two female figures hold a banner on which AUGUSTEUM used to be written in gold letters. On the outside of each of the side panels there is an acroterion.

== History ==
From 1831 to 1836, the Augusteum of the University of Leipzig was built on Augustusplatz according to plans by Albert Geutebrück. Karl Friedrich Schinkel had reworked the façade in a classicist style. This resulted in a high portal framed by columns, which bore the inscription AUGUSTEUM in gold letters. Schinkel designed a pictorial decoration for the columns, which was implemented by the Dresden sculptor Ernst Rietschel (1804–1861).

Locations of the Schinkel Gate

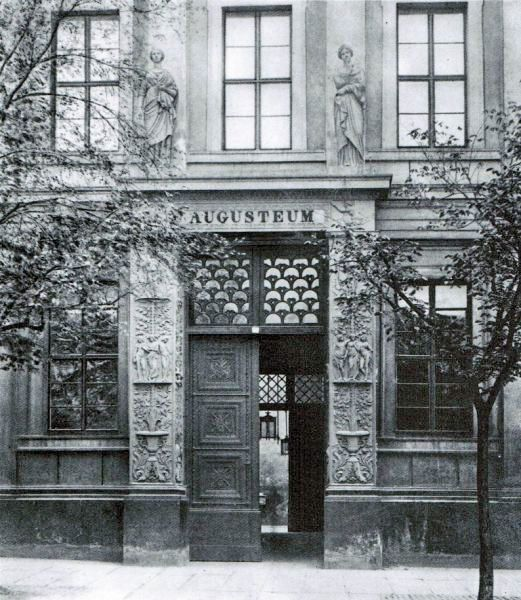
Original at the Augusteum by Geutebrück
(1836–1895)

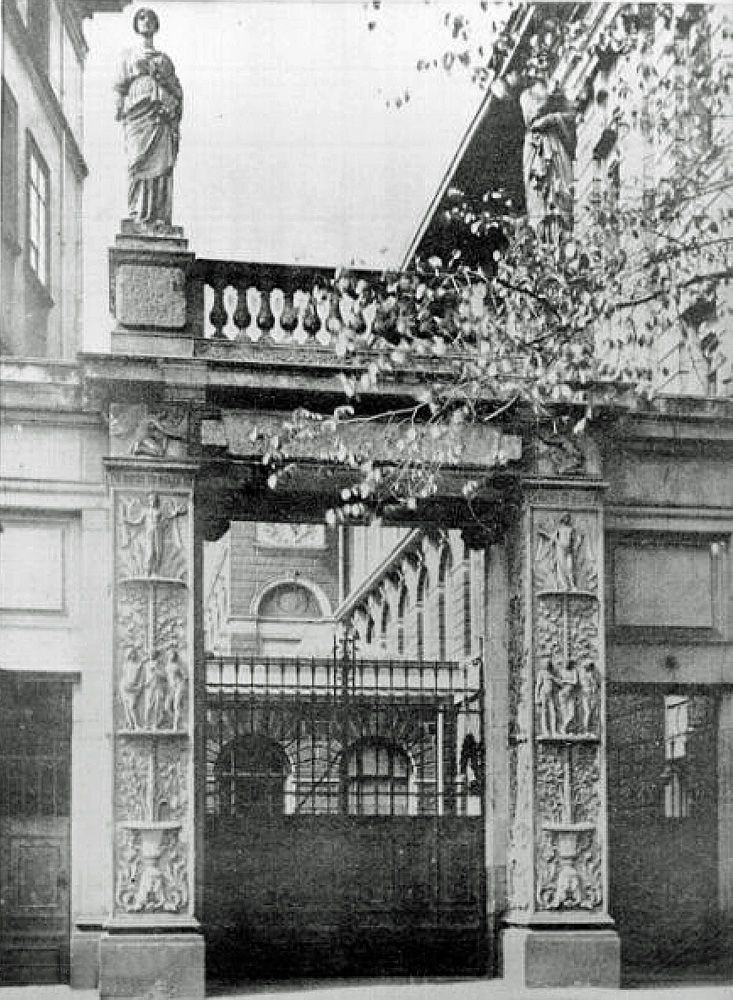
Between Augusteum and Uni-Rentamt (from 1897)

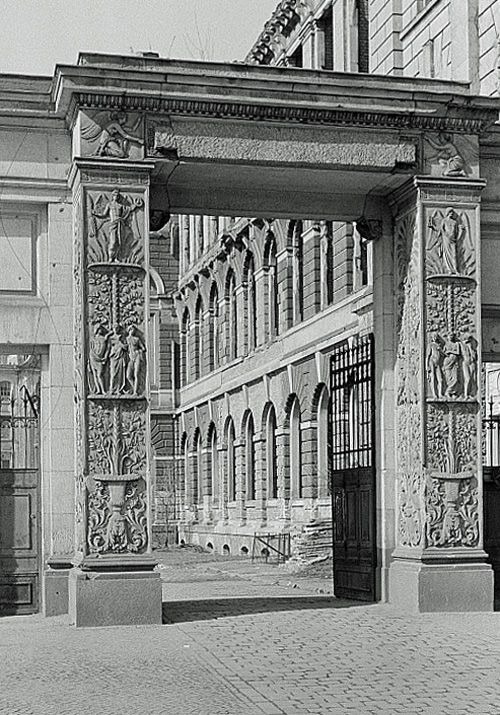
Same place after the Second World War
(until 1965)

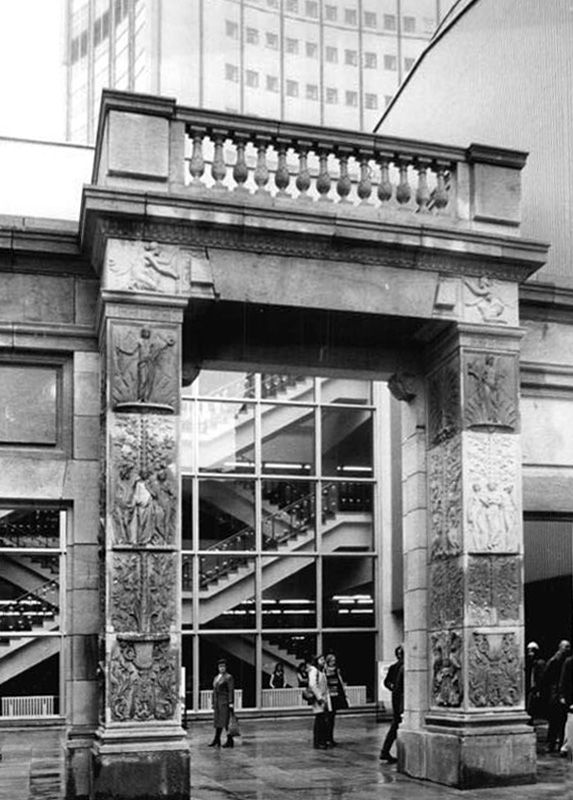
In the courtyard of the Karl Marx University
(1981–2007)

When the Augusteum was fundamentally redesigned by Arwed Roßbach (1844–1902) from 1891 to 1897, the old Augusteum entrance was extended by two side sections and the balustrade and set up as access to the garden area on the south front of the Johanneum between the south corner of the Augusteum and the University Rent Office. The name Schinkeltor now became common.

The Schinkel Gate was damaged in the Second World War. The balustrade and the figures of the muses were lost. In 1965, the Schinkel Gate was demolished and stored. After a partial restoration, it was set up in 1981 as a separate building between the new seminar and lecture hall buildings on Universitätsstrasse.

The Dutch architect Erick van Egeraat (born 1956) used it on the west side of his new building of the Augusteum as an entrance from the Leibnizforum. For this purpose, it was extensively restored by the Leipzig sculptor Markus Gläser (born 1960), and the figures of the muses on the balustrade were also recreated.
