= Augusteum (Leipzig) =

Coordinates: 51°20′19″N 12°22′46″E

- The Augusteum after its 1897 reconstruction

General information
- Location: Augustusplatz, Leipzig; Germany
- Current tenants: University of Leipzig
- Construction started: 1831
- Completed: 1836
- Demolished: 1968

The Augusteum was a building on the Augustusplatz in Leipzig, Germany, to the left of the Paulinerkirche. It was built on the 1543 site of the University of Leipzig and served as its main building. It was demolished and replaced by a modern building in 1968; in 2012, a "New Augusteum" commemorating the historic building was completed on its site.

== History ==
The Augusteum was built between 1831 and 1836 to plans by Albert Geutebrück, though its façade referred back to a classicist design by Karl Friedrich Schinkel. The building had, however, already reached its full capacity by the 1870s since the university had grown due to major urban expansion in this period. The building was generously rebuilt and expanded from 1892 to 1897 by the architect Arwed Rossbach. The Augusteum had originally only had a front onto the Augustusplatz, but, due to the demolition of the old Paulinum (i.e. the building of the medieval St. Paul's monastery and St. Paul's college), could now receive a south wing known as the Johanneum (1895), a middle wing known as the Albertinum (1896) and a west wing known as the Paulinum (1896). The renovation also altered the building's style to fit in better with other buildings on the Augustusplatz, with Neo-Renaissance and Neo Gothic façades being added to the Paulinerkirche and Augusteum to plans by Rossbach.

The Augusteum was heavily damaged by bombing in the Second World War. The painting The Prime of Greece by Max Klinger in the assembly hall was lost by burning. The East German government decided it was beyond repair and (like the fully intact Paulinerkirche) ill-fitting for their concept of a university. Thus the two buildings were dynamited on 30 May 1968. This cleared an area on which a new university complex in functional and sober DDR architectural style was built in 1975. Until 1971 a rectory building was on the site of the Augusteum's main wing.

After German reunification, a citizens' initiative for the reconstruction of the university church and Augusteum of Leipzig gathered, but after years of litigation, demands for reconstruction were waived in favour of the university's need for modern teaching and research facilities. A plan was drawn up by Erick van Egeraat for a campus building recalling parts of the Augusteum's façade, and an auditorium designed to appear like the Paulinerkirche, but the historic main building of the university would not rise again.

== Reconstruction ==
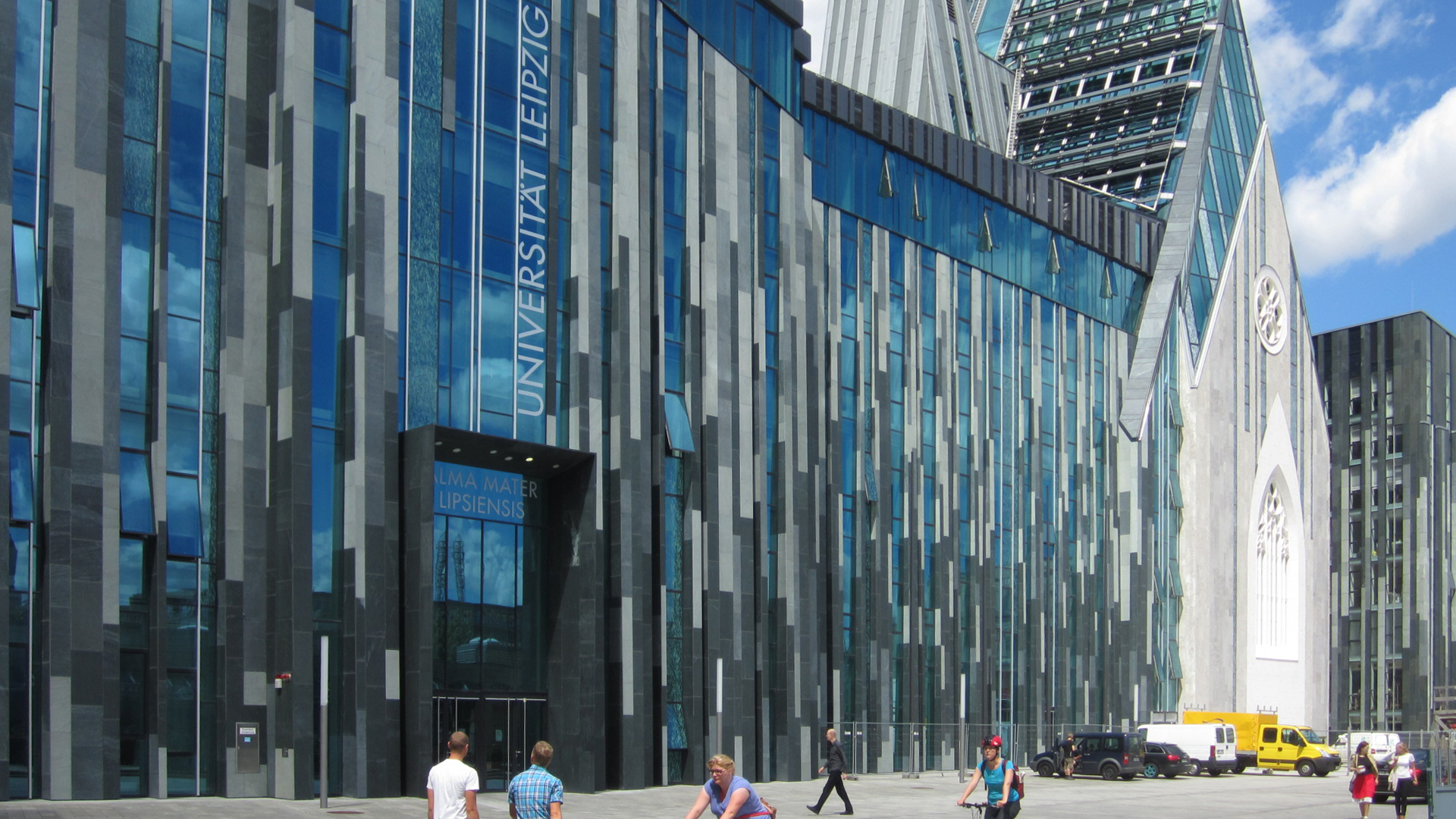
The new Augusteum as Leipzig University's main building with the Paulinum in 2012

In 2006, the campus at Augustusplatz, consisting of the main building (Hauptgebäude) at the place of the former Augusteum and Paulinerkirche, the lecture hall building (Hörsaalgebäude), seminar building (Seminargebäude) and dining hall building (Mensagebäude), began reconstruction. The new building for the faculty of economic sciences and parts of the renovated seminar building, the long-overdue new dining hall building, and other parts, including the new Augusteum and Paulinum have all been completed.

== Gallery ==
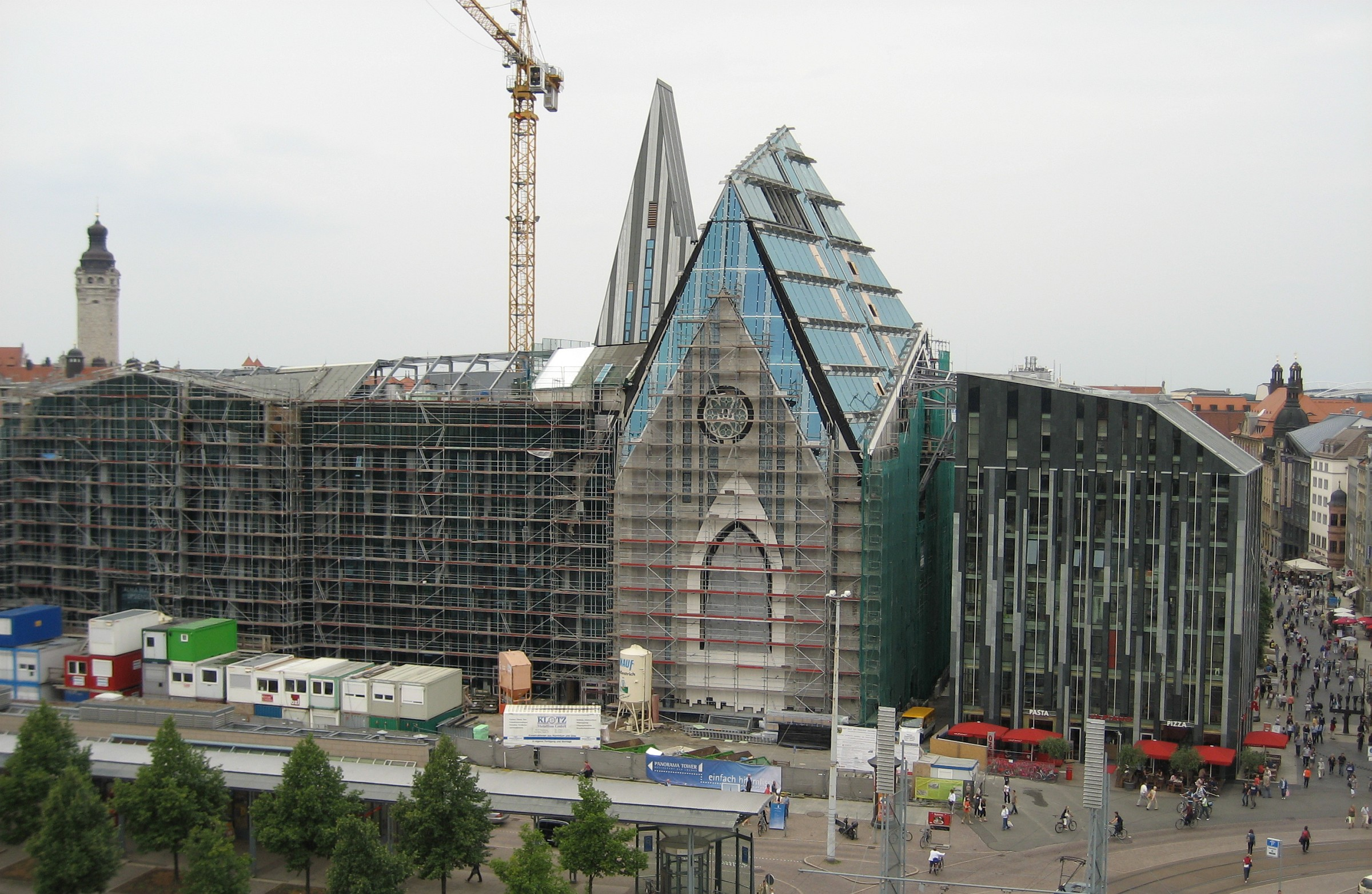
The building under construction

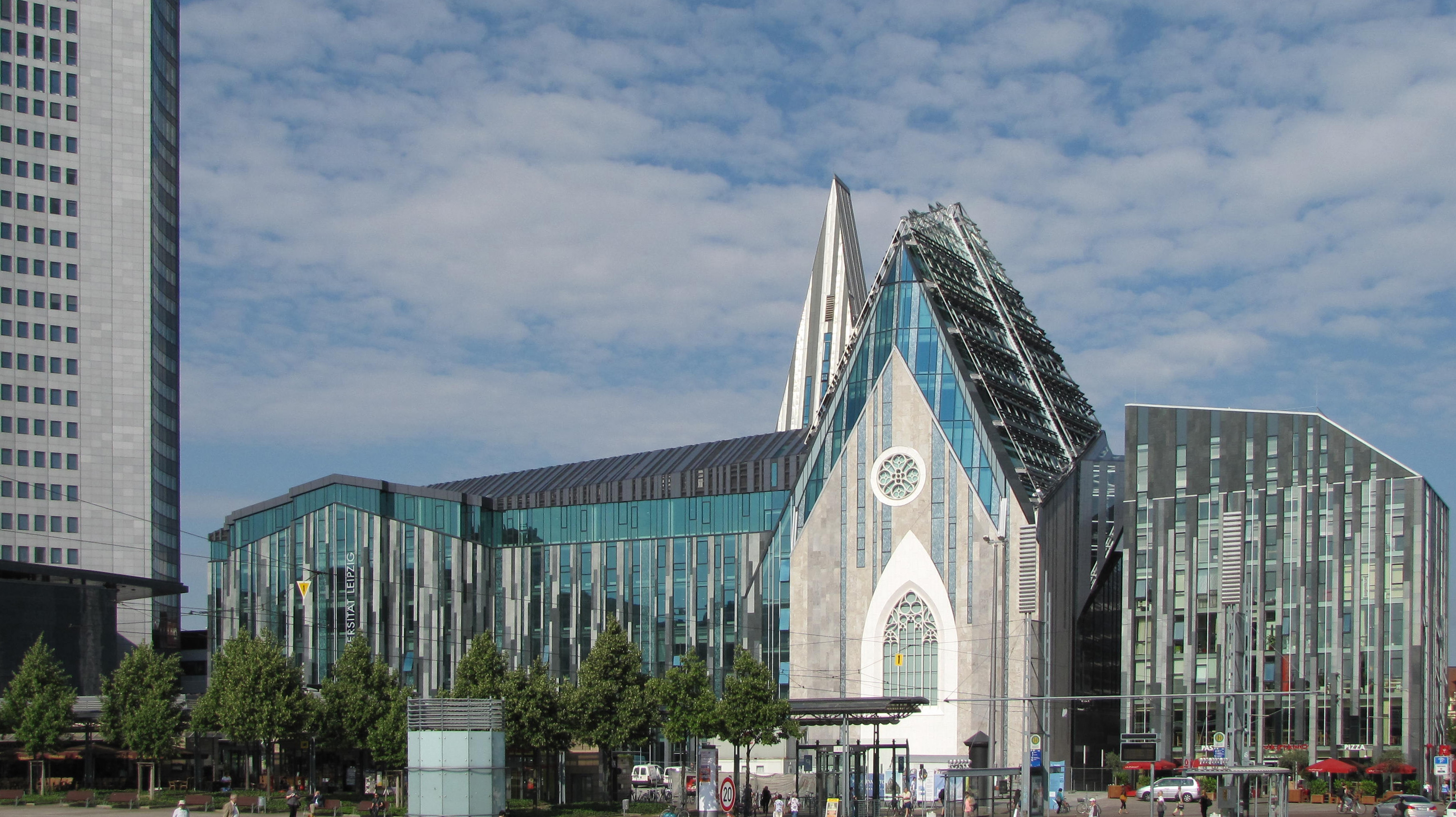
The complex of buildings in 2012

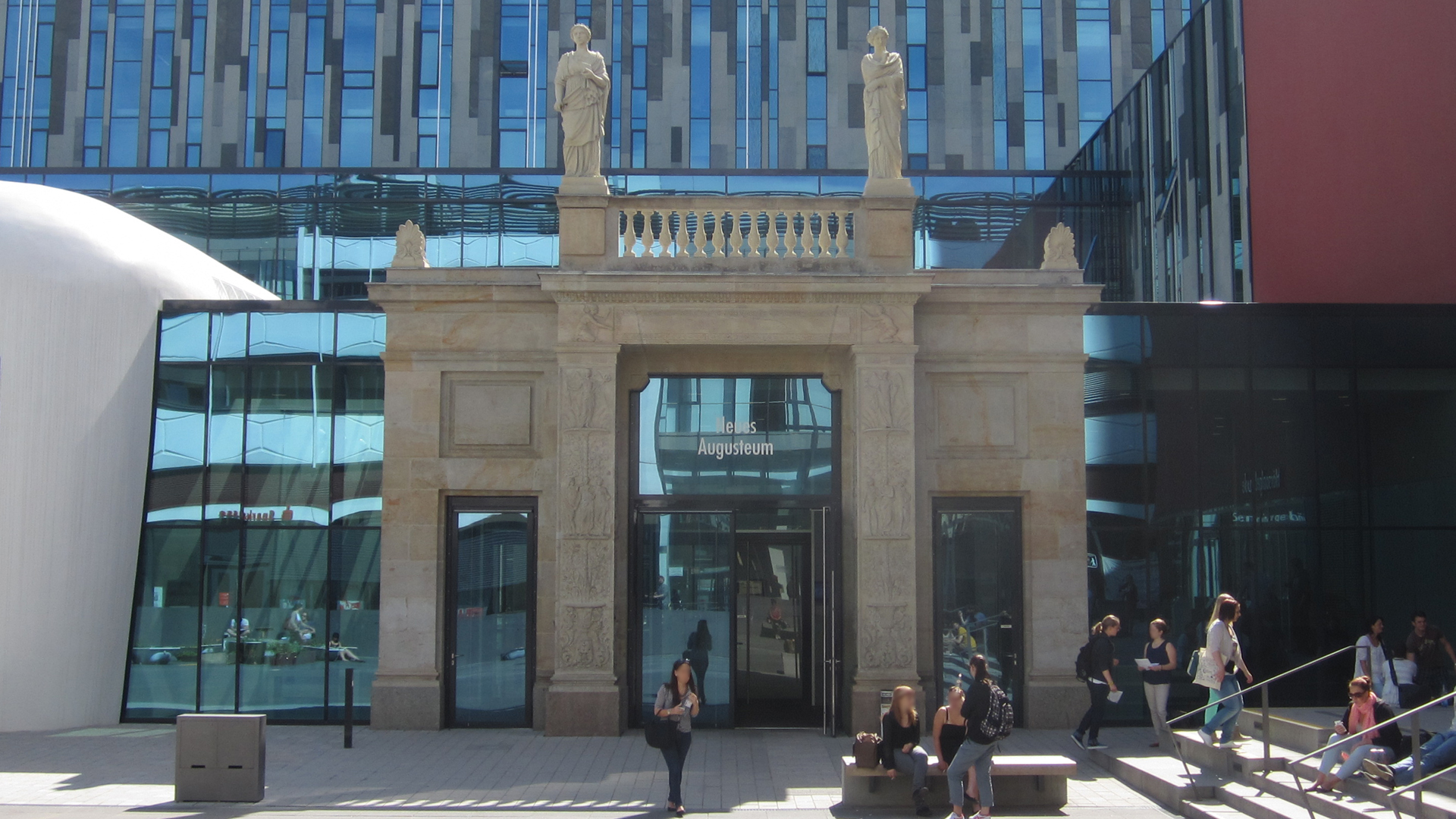
The Schinkel Gate, back entrance of the Augusteum

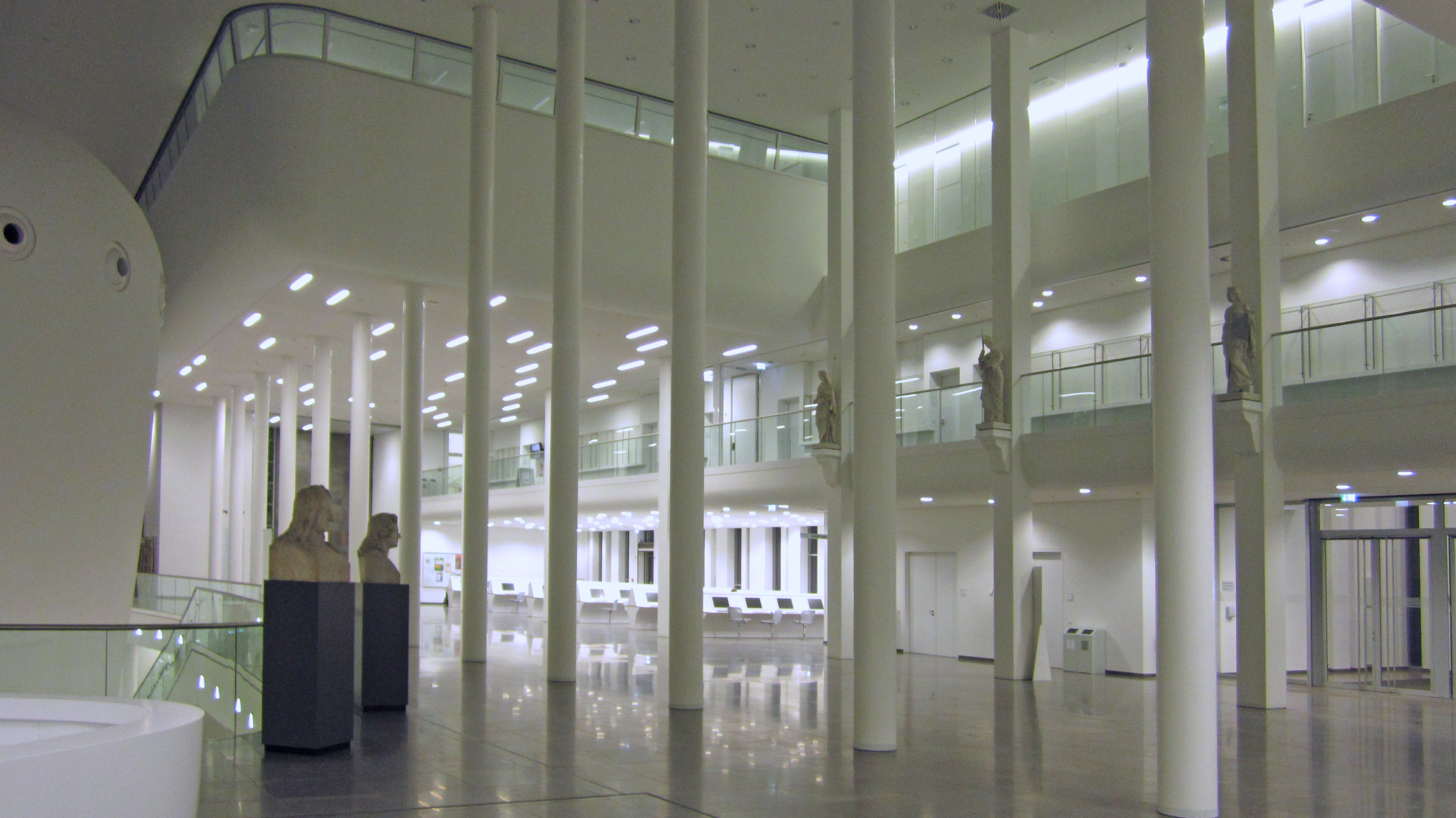
Inside the Augusteum
