= Albert Geutebrück =

German classicist architect

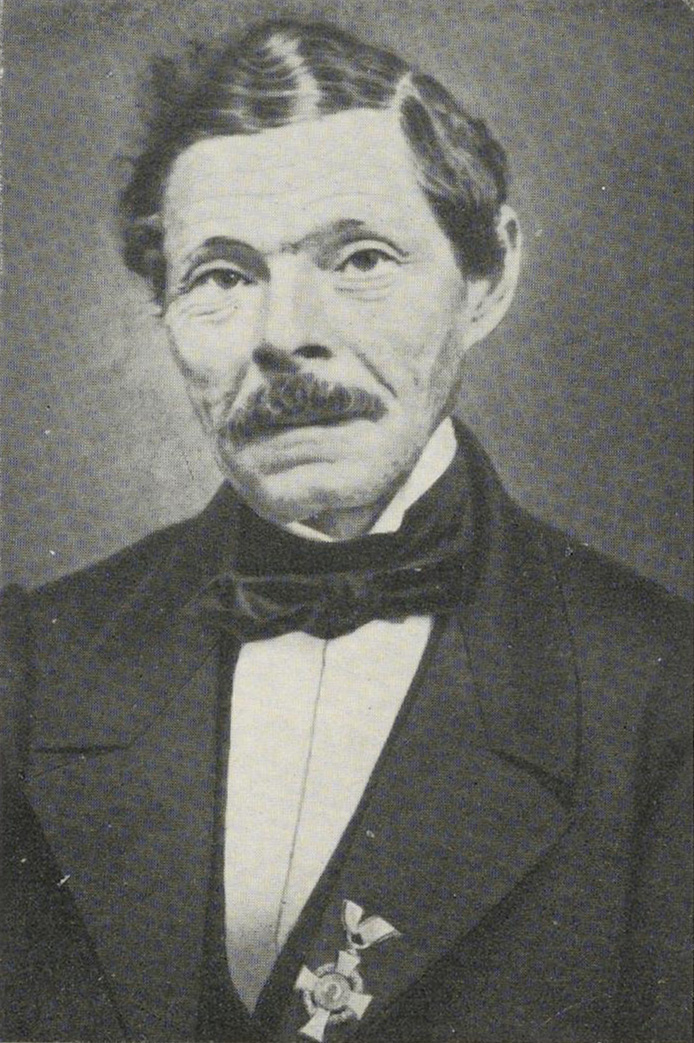
Photo of Albert Geutebrück (1863)

Albert Geutebrück (6 January 1801 in Gotha – 13 March 1868 in Graz, Steiermark) was a German classicist architect and the director of the School of Building and Construction at the University of Leipzig. He is most known for the building, the Augusteum.

Geutebrück constructed the Augusteum building on the Augustusplatz in Leipzig, Germany, which was built in 1836 on the site of the University of Leipzig and served as its main building.

Geutebrück was a member of the Leipzig Association of Art Friends and an honorary member of the Royal Institute of British Architects (RIBA).
