= Otto Greiner =

German painter

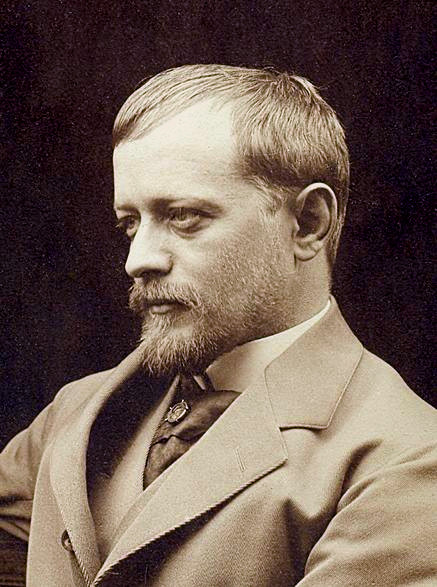
Otto Greiner in 1900

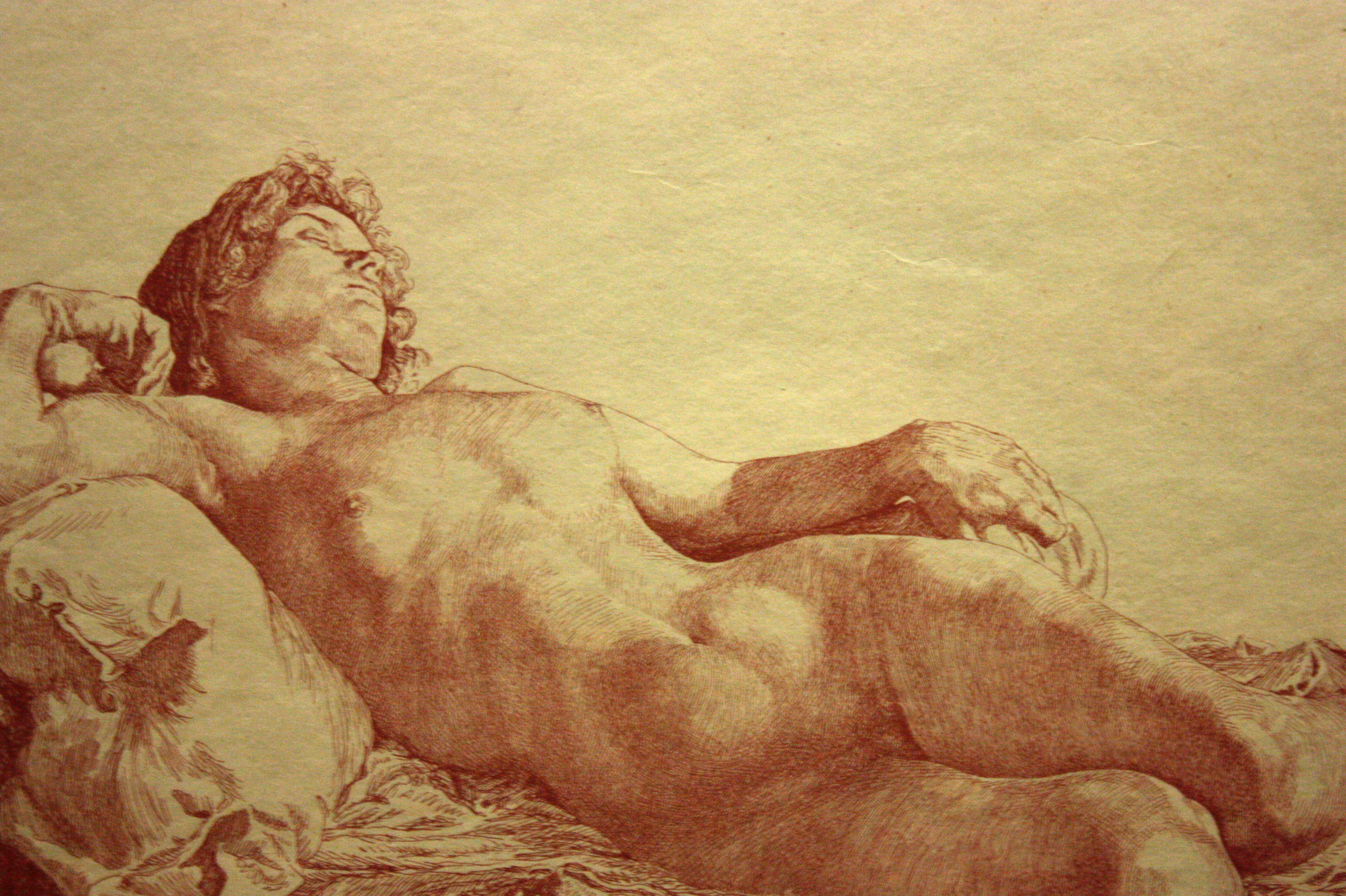
Eve (detail from "Eve, The Devil, and Sin") by Otto Greiner, 1898

Otto Greiner (16 December 1869 – 24 September 1916) was a German painter and graphic artist.

He was born in Leipzig and began his career there as a lithographer and engraver. He relocated to Munich around 1888 and studied there under Alexander Liezen-Mayer. Greiner's mature style – characterized by unexpected spatial juxtapositions and a sharply focused, photographic naturalism – was strongly influenced by the work of Max Klinger, whom he met in 1891 while visiting Rome.

Greiner died in Munich in 1916. The largest collection of his work in the United States is held by the Jack Daulton Collection in Los Altos Hills, California.

== See also ==
- List of German painters
