= Augustusplatz =

Square in Leipzig, Germany

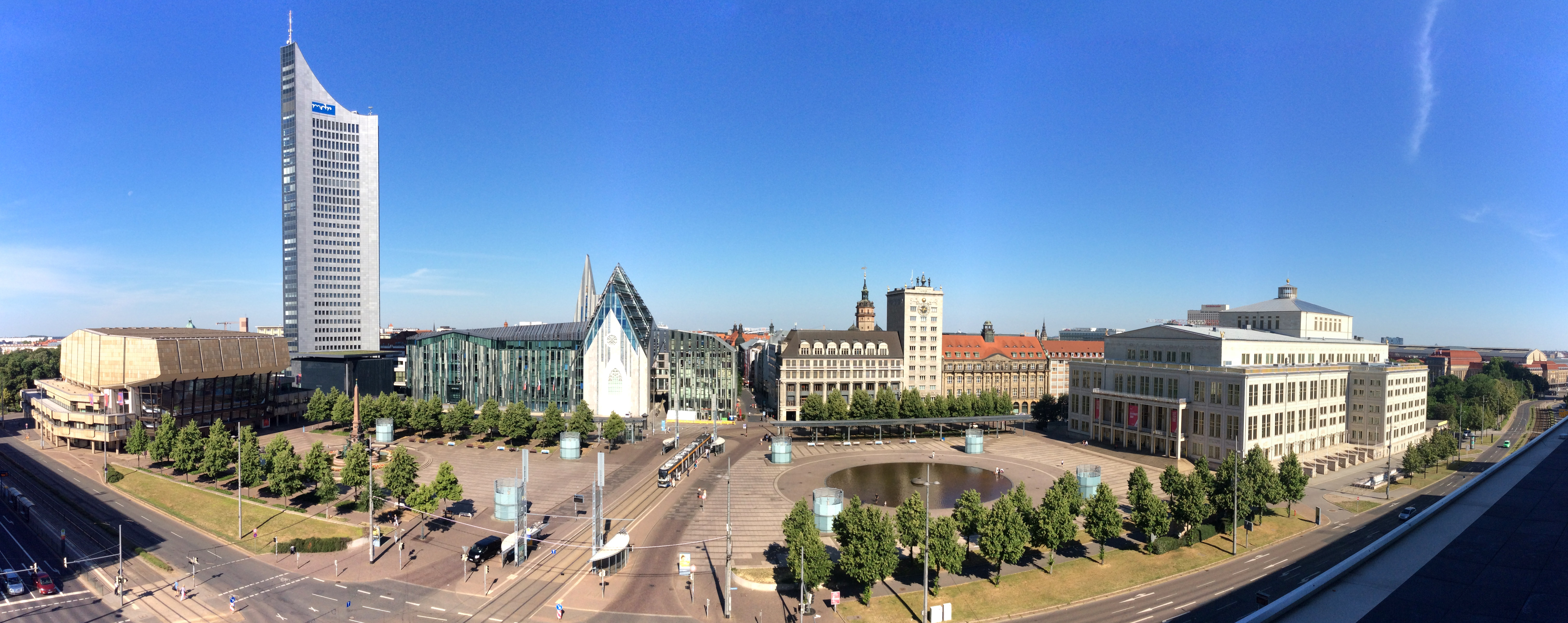
- Augustusplatz panorama, 2019
- Interactive map of Augustusplatz
- Former names: Platz vor dem Grimmaischen Tor, Karl-Marx-Platz
- Length: 215 m (705 ft)
- Width: 185 m (607.0 ft)
- Location: Leipzig-Mitte, Leipzig, Germany
- Postal code: 04109
- Coordinates: 51°20′21″N 12°22′51″E

The Augustusplatz is a square located at the east end of the city centre of Leipzig, borough Leipzig-Mitte. It is the city's largest square and one of the largest squares in Europe. It is also part of the city's inner-city ring-road and a central hub for its tram network.

== History ==
The history of today's square began in 1785 (see also: Promenadenring) on a site within the city walls as the Platz vor dem Grimmaischen Tor (Square in front of the Grimma Gate) to designs by the city architect Johann Carl Friedrich Dauthe. It was renamed Augustusplatz in 1839 after Frederick Augustus, the first king of Saxony. In 1928 the social-democratic city government renamed it Karl-Marx-Platz, though this name proved unpopular and was ignored even in newspaper articles and town plans. In 1933 the Nazis renamed it Augustusplatz, then in 1953 it became Karl-Marx-Platz again, and finally in 1990 (on the day of German reunification) it returned to its current name of Augustusplatz.

The main buildings of the Fair town are grouped round the Augustusplatz, which, in spite of an enormous amount of traffic, is very dignified and is the headquarters of commercial life of Leipzig.

— from Eugene Fodor's 1936 ... On the Continent. The Entertaining Travel Annual

It is now dominated by the Opernhaus on its northern edge, the Neues Gewandhaus (with the Mendebrunnen) on southern side, and the main buildings of the University of Leipzig, including the City-Hochhaus Leipzig on the western side bordering the city centre. Destruction during the Second World War and the radical city-planning policies of the GDR both mean the Augustusplatz has lost its historical appearance: the previous main post office (Hauptpost), the newly built "Blu Radisson Hotel Leipzig" (former names: Hotel Mercure, Interhotel am Ring, Hotel Deutschland) and the university complex are all built mainly of concrete and steel in the style of the 1960s or later. In May 1968, for example, the bomb-damaged Augusteum and the university church that had suffered little damage (Paulinerkirche) were both dynamited. From 4 September 1989 to 1990, Monday demonstrations took place. From 1996 to 1998 an underground car park was built under the Augustusplatz with many entrances and ventilation shafts leading on to the square, the construction of which proved controversial. The carpark's eight illuminated glass cylinders housing the stairwells have been mocked in particular, being nicknamed "Milchtöpfe" or milk-bottles.

The construction of the university's new main building or Paulinum involved a fierce controversy over the possible reconstruction of the university church between 2002 and 2004. Although completion of the complex was hoped for in 2009 for the university's 600th anniversary, the new Augusteum was completed not sooner than 2012. The new Paulinum recalls with its auditorium and the gabled roof the style of the former Augusteum and the demolished church. Its opening, which was also planned for 2009, was delayed until the beginning of December 2017. In the meantime, disputes about the future use of the new building on the site of the Paulinerkirche led to a blockage of the work, later there were complications with the completion of the glass columns for the interior of the building.

The main part of the university complex facing Augustusplatz was redesigned according to plans by the architect Erick van Egeraat.

== Notable buildings ==
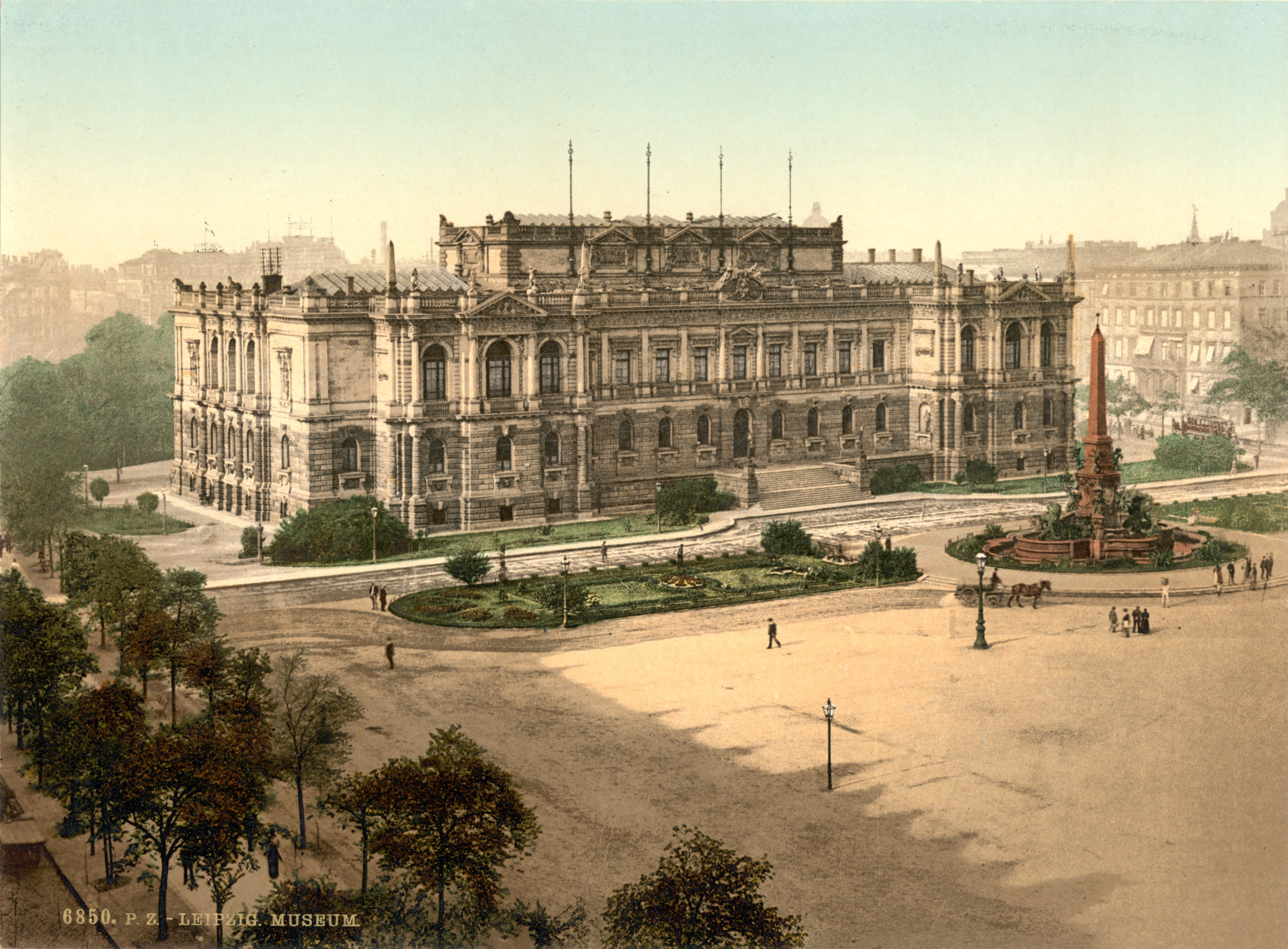
Museum of Fine Arts at Augustusplatz in 1890

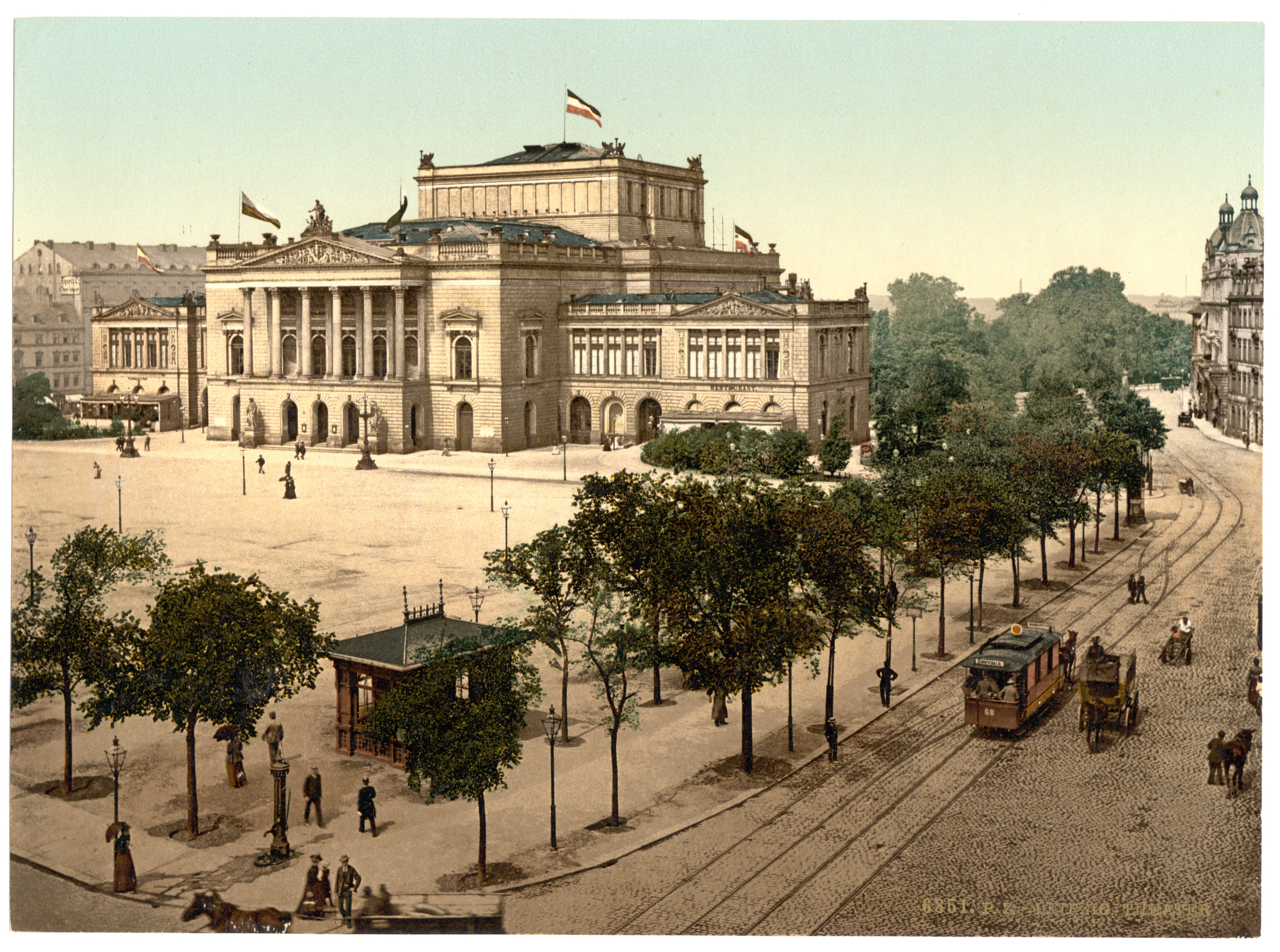
Neues Theater on Augustusplatz, in 1900

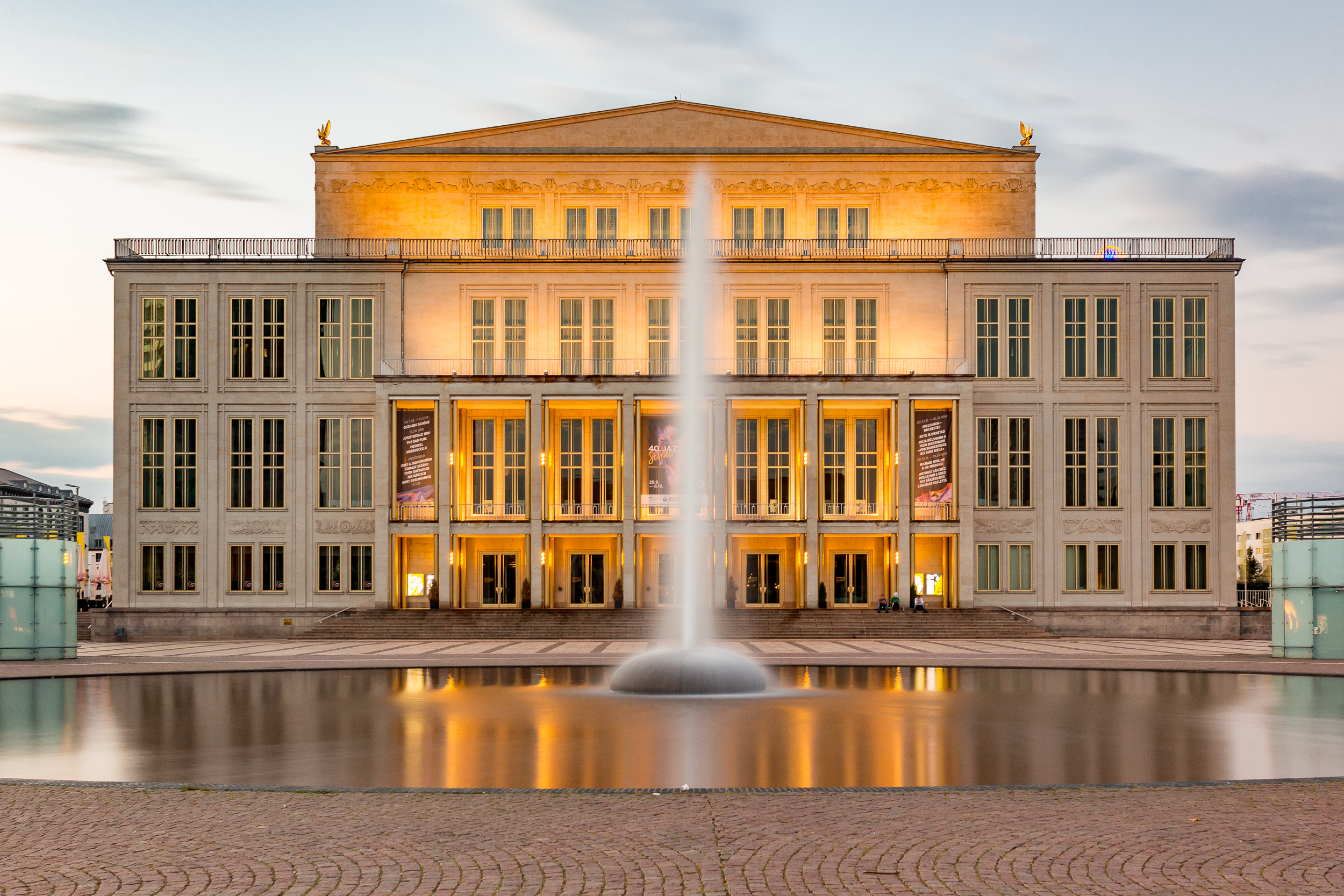
Leipzig Opera today

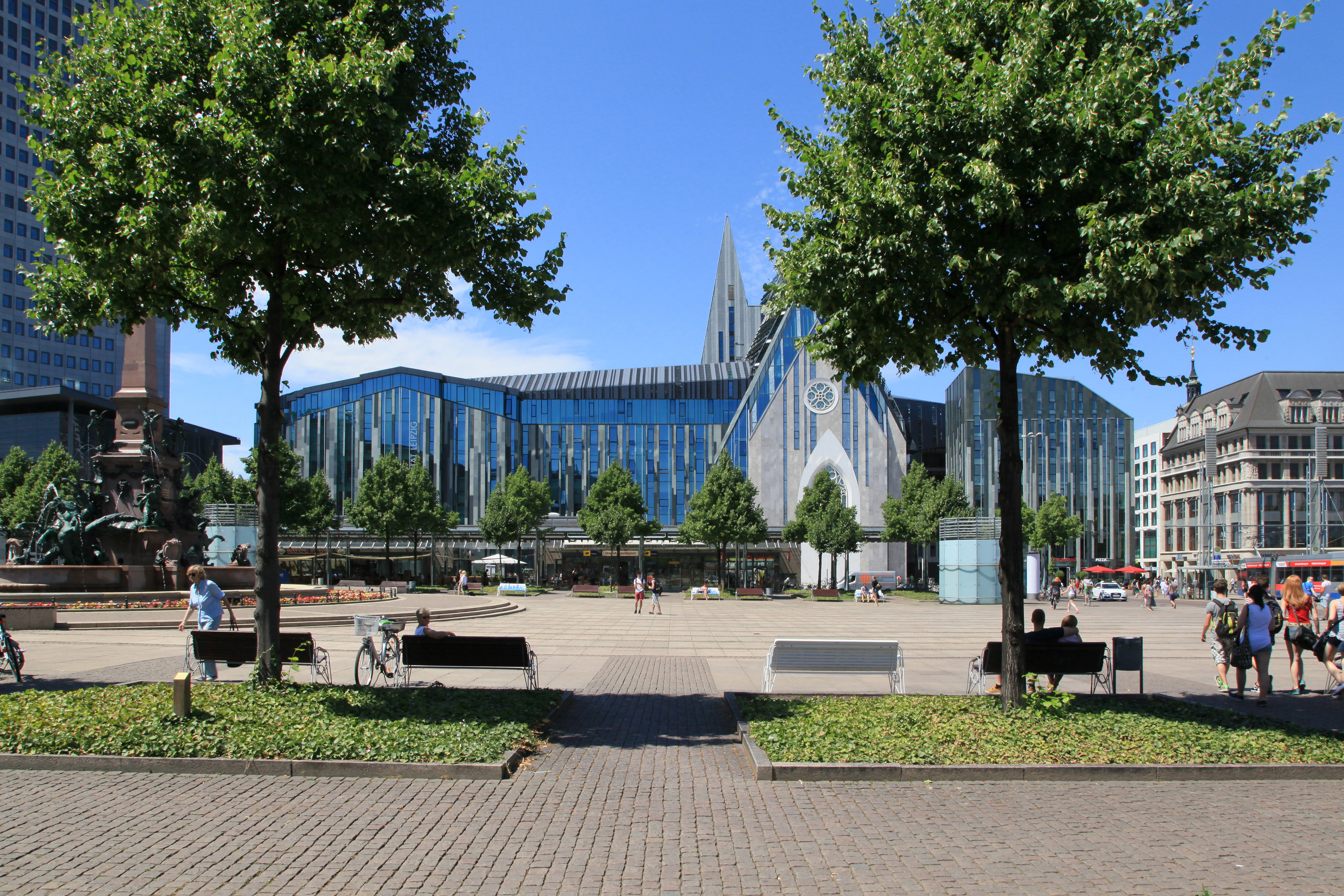
The new Augusteum

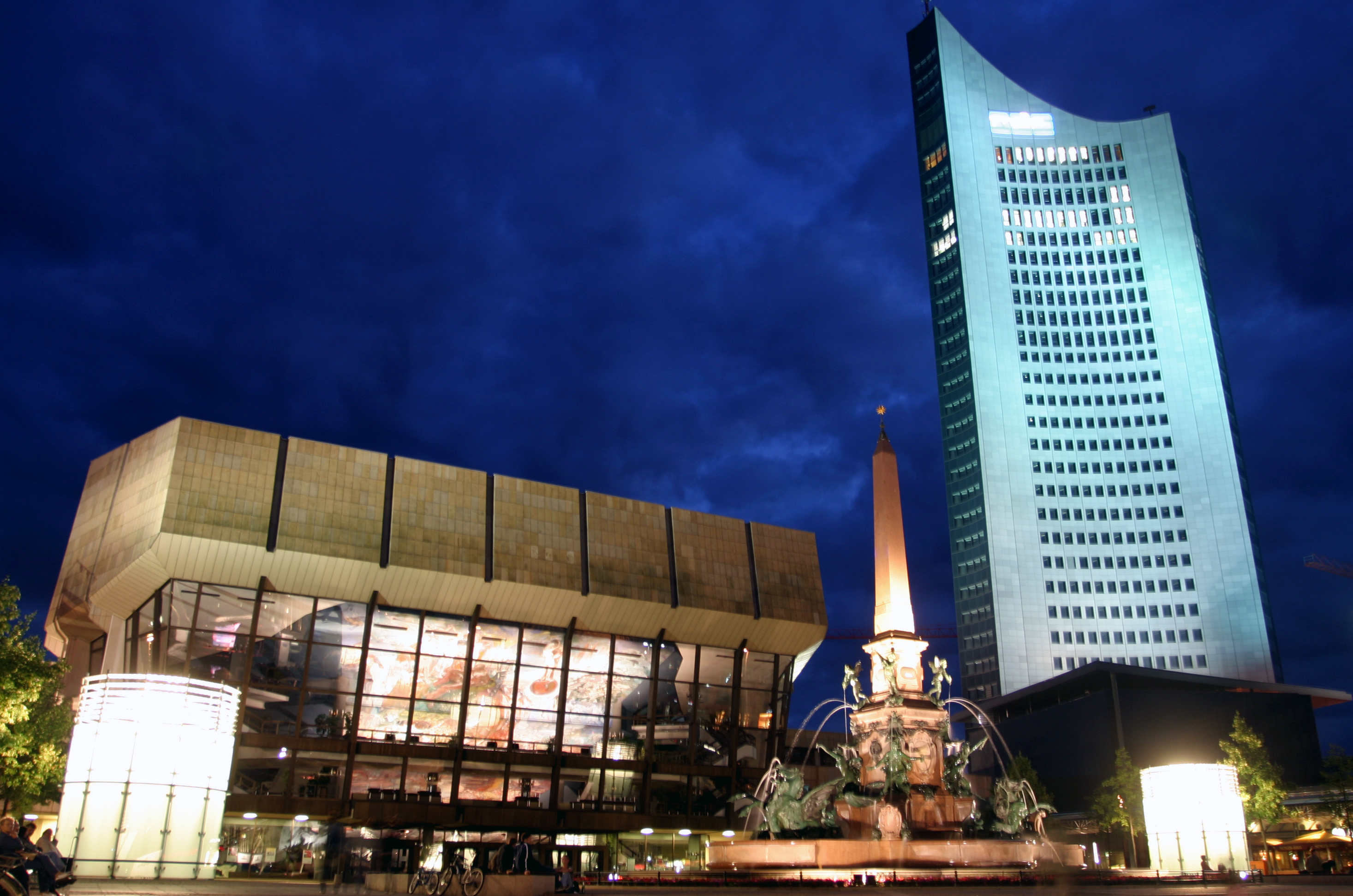
The Gewandhaus with the City-Hochhaus Leipzig in the background

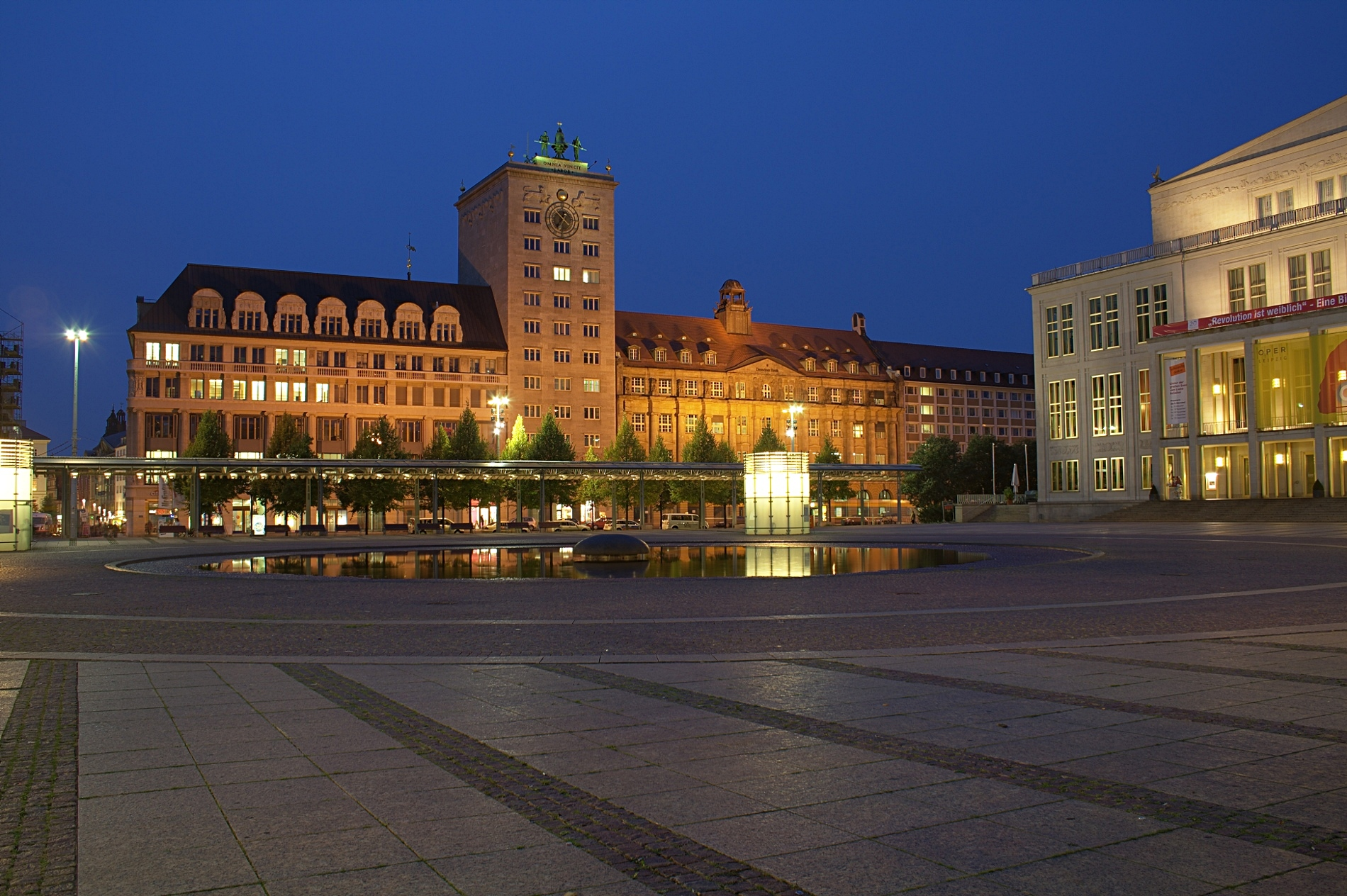
Kroch High-rise, Leipzig's first high-rise building (built in 1927/28)

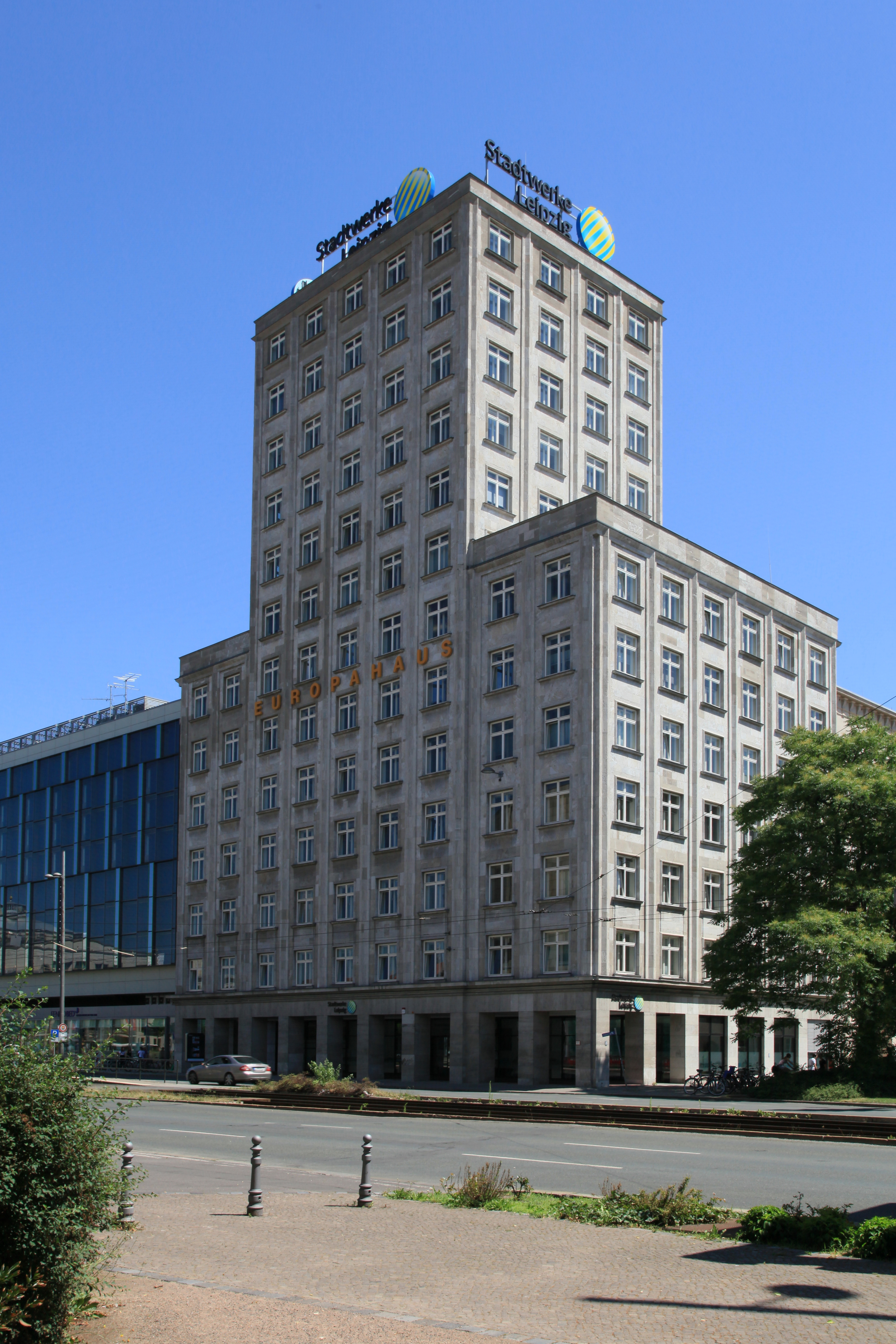
Europahaus

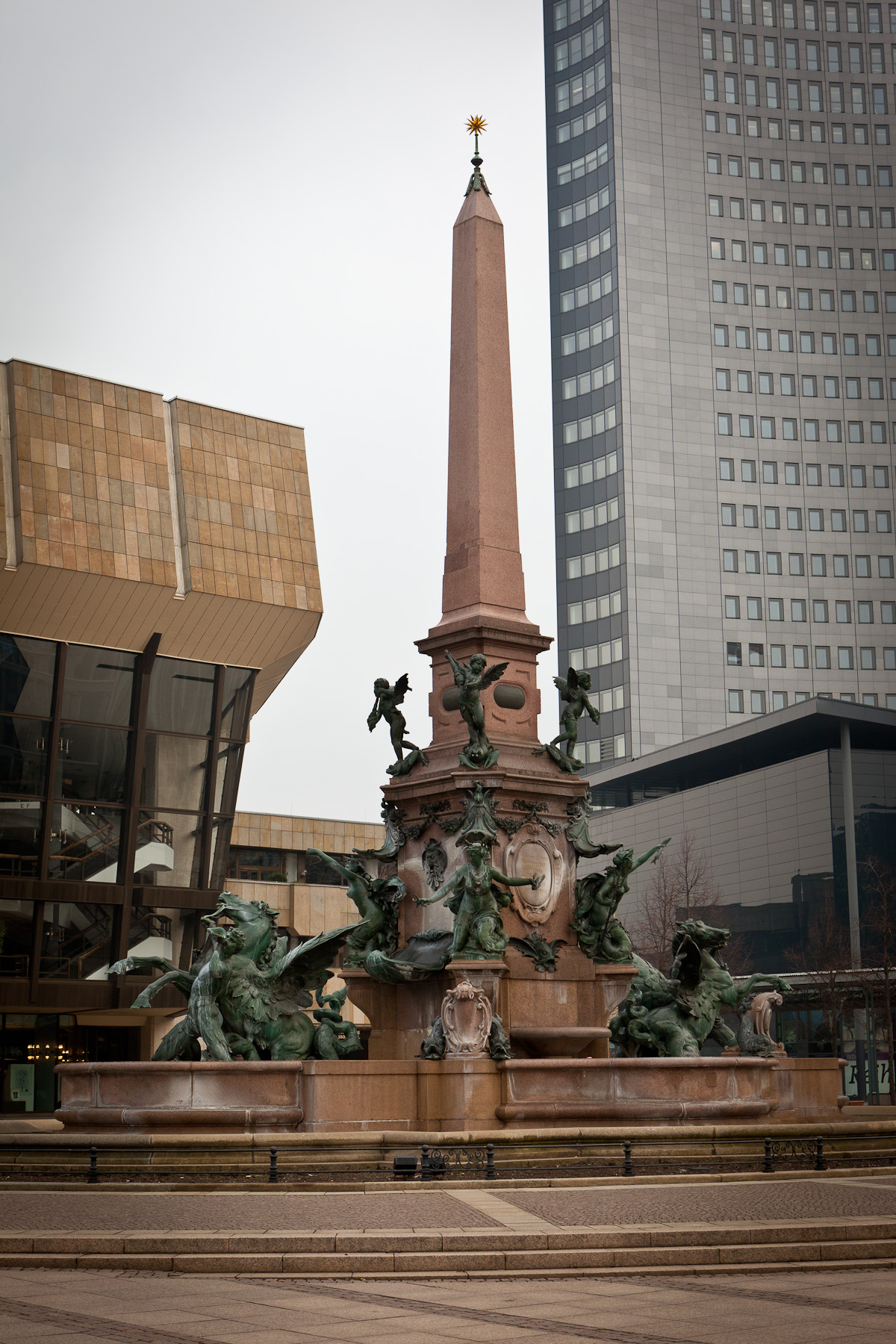
Mendebrunnen

== Democracy bell ==
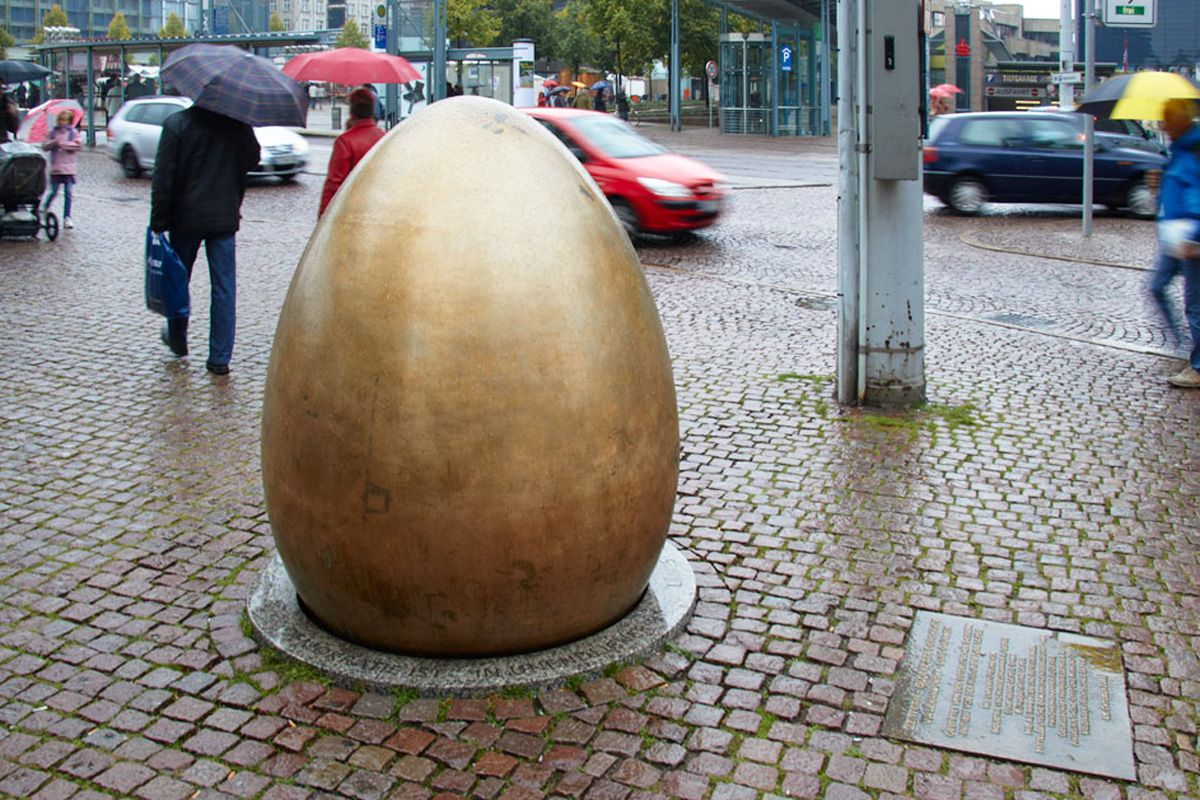
The democracy bell (2010)

On 9 October 2009, a public art object by the artist Via Lewandowsky, the Democracy Bell, was unveiled opposite the curve of the tram tracks at Grimmaische Strasse. It commemorates the Monday demonstration on 9 October 1989. The bell rings every Monday at 6:35 p.m., which was around the time the demonstration began, also every 9 October at 10:30 a.m., and every day between 8 a.m. and 8 p.m. within each full hour randomly with one up to twelve beats. The bell is made of bronze and has the shape of an egg about three feet tall.

== Tram interchange station ==
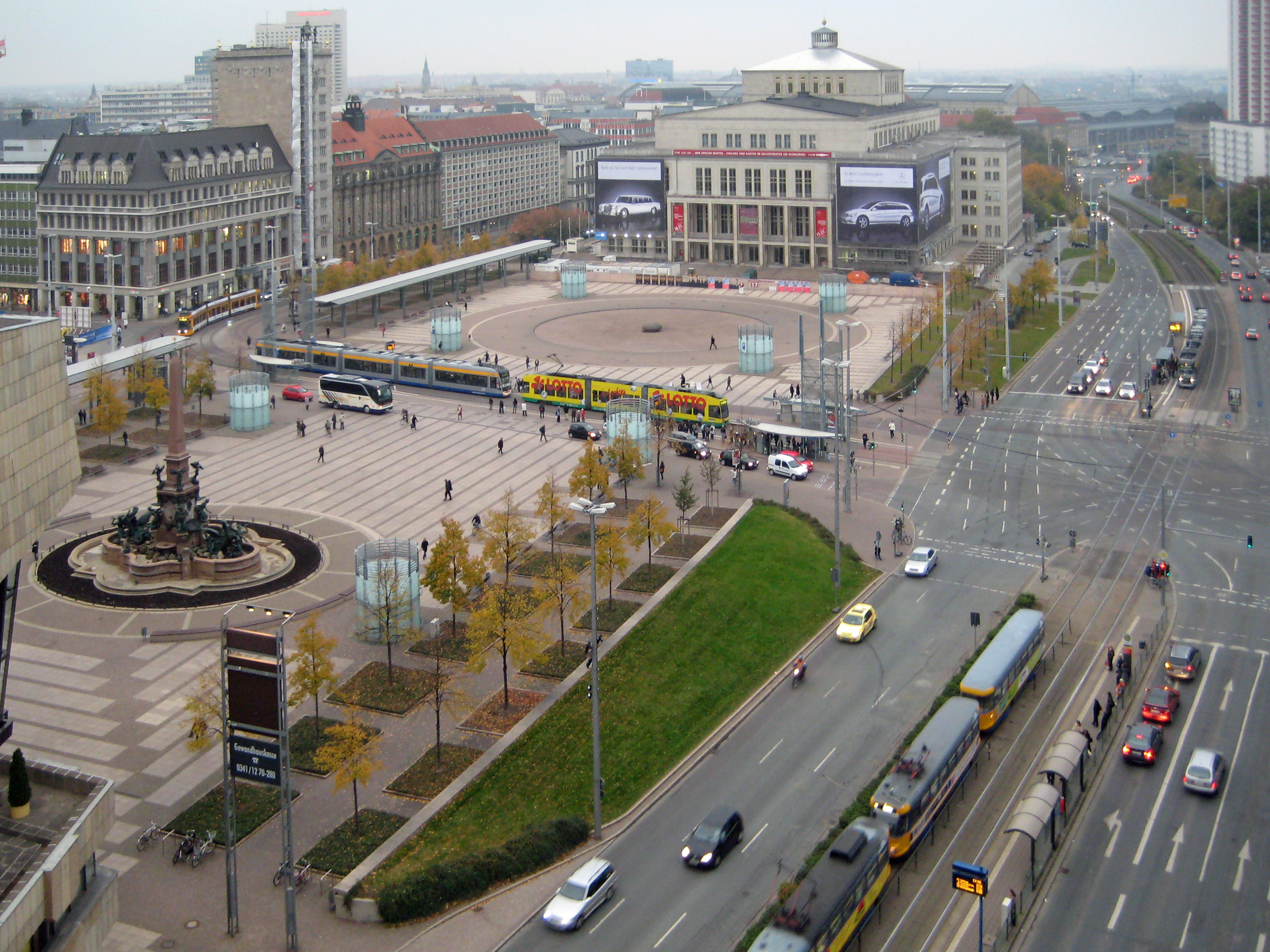
Well recognisable: crossing tram stop at the ring road and at the place itself

Augustusplatz is also the name of a major interchange station in the Leipzig tram network of the Leipzig Transport Company. The interchange station is designed as a crossing stop, with two tracks running in a north–south direction on the inner city ring road (east side of Augustusplatz) and two more in an east–west direction on the middle lane on Augustusplatz (in the relation between Goethestraße and Grimmaischer Steinweg). If the middle lane is closed during events, tram traffic is guaranteed by the fact that the affected lines can turn from the stop on the inner city ring into Grimmaischer Steinweg via a connecting curve.

The trains of lines 8, 10, 11, 14, 16 and N10 stop at the tram stop at the eastern edge (before the crossing) and those of lines 4, 7, 12, 15 and N17 at the tram stop on the central lane. At both stops can stop two trains at the same time in each direction.

== See also ==
- Architecture of Leipzig
- List of tallest buildings in Leipzig
- List of streets and squares in Leipzig
- Leipzig Christmas Market

== Literature ==
- Thomas Topfstedt, Pit Lehmann (ed.): Der Leipziger Augustusplatz. Funktionen und Gestaltwandel eines Großstadtplatzes. Leipziger Universitätsverlag, Leipzig 1994, ISBN 3-929031-28-0, in German
- Wolfgang Hocquél, Leipzig. Architektur von der Romanik bis zur Gegenwart, Passage Verlag Leipzig 2004, ISBN 3-932900-54-5, in German
- Augustusplatz, in: Horst Riedel, Stadtlexikon. Leipzig von A bis Z, Pro Leipzig 2005, ISBN 3-936508-03-8, p. 29f, in German
- Ringel, Sebastian (2015). Leipzig! One Thousand Years of History. Leipzig: Autor und Edition Leipzig in Seemann Henschel GmbH & Co. KG. pp. 70, 123, 187f. ISBN 978-3-361-00710-9.
- Annette Menting, Leipzig. Reclams Städteführer Architektur und Kunst, Reclam Verlag, Stuttgart 2015, ISBN 978-3-15-019259-7, in German
- Andrew Demshuk, Karl Marx Square. Cultural Barbarism and the People's State in 1968, Oxford University Press, Oxford / New York 2017, ISBN 9780190645144, (E-Book)
