= Südfriedhof (Leipzig) =

Cemetery in Saxony, Germany

Südfriedhof South Cemetery
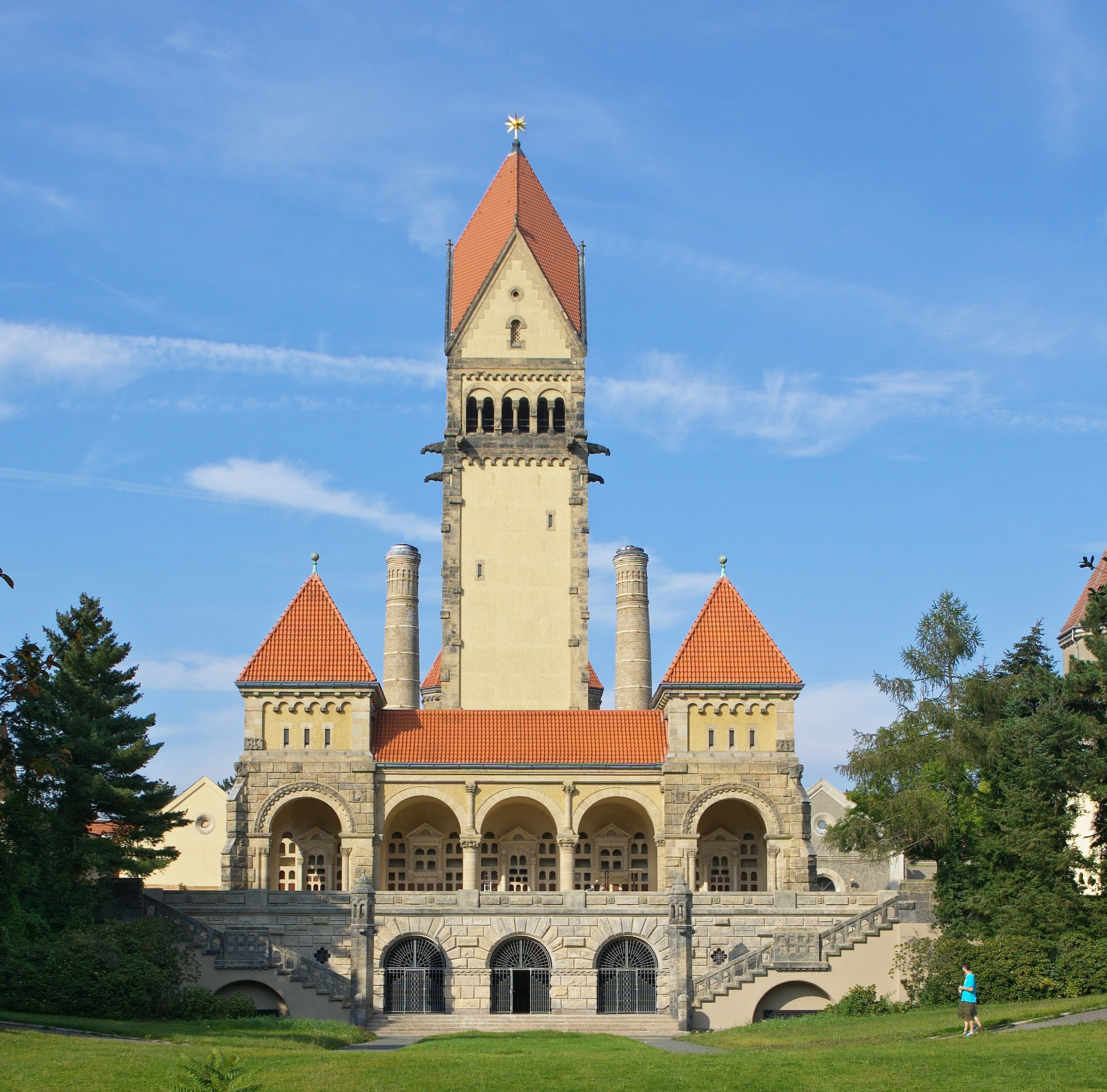
- South side of the chapel complex
- Interactive map of Südfriedhof; South Cemetery

Details
- Established: 1886
- Location: Leipzig, Saxony
- Country: Germany
- Coordinates: 51°18′33″N 12°24′45″E
- Type: Public
- Size: 82 ha (200 acres)
- Website: Website

Südfriedhof (German: South Cemetery) is, with an area of 82 hectares, the largest cemetery in Leipzig. It is located in the south of Leipzig in the immediate vicinity of the Völkerschlachtdenkmal. The Südfriedhof is one of the largest rural cemeteries in Germany, along with the Ohlsdorf Cemetery in Hamburg and the Stahnsdorf South-Western Cemetery in Berlin.

== History ==
The plans for the cemetery began in 1879. Initially it was created on an area of 54 hectares under the direction of horticultural director of Leipzig, Otto Wittenberg and the architect Hugh Licht. The conduct of ways is in form of a linden leaf, which reflects the Slavic name of Leipzig "The Town of the Linden", and fulfil the aims of Art Nouveau as a Gesamtkunstwerk.

With the rapid development of the city during its industrialisation, incorporation of nearby settlements and the consequent steady population growth, a new cemetery was needed. After the opening of Nordfriedhof (North Cemetery) firstly in 1881, the Southern-Cemetery was inaugurated on 1 June 1886 by the mayor of Leipzig, Dr. Otto Georgi and the governor Dr. H. A. Platzmann, and later the burial ground was consecrated by the Lutheran provost Superintendent Wilhelm Hölscher. Shortly after, the first burial was made, the grave is still preserved in the I. Division. However, this burial ground was very unpopular at first. Many citizens of Leipzig chose to be buried at the Neuer Johannisfriedhof (New St. John's Cemetery) but this changed when it began to fill up and the trees on the Südfriedhof became greater and the proposed park character was recognisable.

Visitors to the nearby Völkerschlachtdenkmal notice at first the chapel with its 60 meter high bell tower, which was opened in 1910. The Neo-Romanesque building ensemble, was built on a filled-up plateau and under the direction of Leipzig's building director Otto Wilhelm Scharenberg. It had the Romanesque Maria Laach Abbey in the Eifel region as a model and is the largest cemetery monument in Germany. The symmetrical complex of chapel facilities, crematorium and columbarium blends inconspicuously into the overall picture and is justified to the main north–south axis of the cemetery. Until 1924 the cemetery was enlarged to 63 hectares. During World War II the most recent cemetery extension was made to the present area of 82 hectares. They buried the 3474 victims of the World War II bombing of Leipzig in today's XXVIII. Division.

Particularly noteworthy are the historical monuments, some of which were by artists such as Max Klinger, Fritz Behn, Max Lange or Carl Seffner created in various styles.

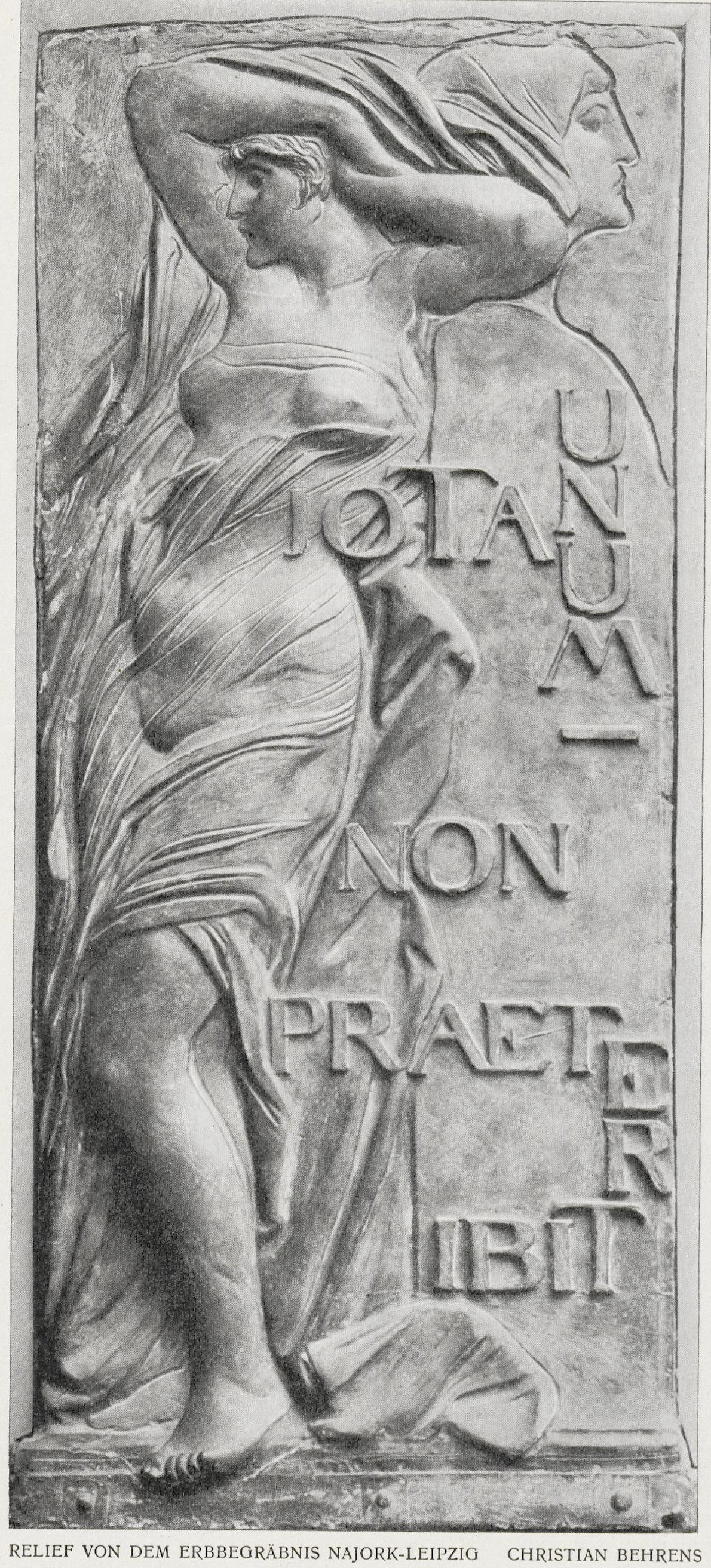
Detail on a grave, Südfriedhof, Leipzig

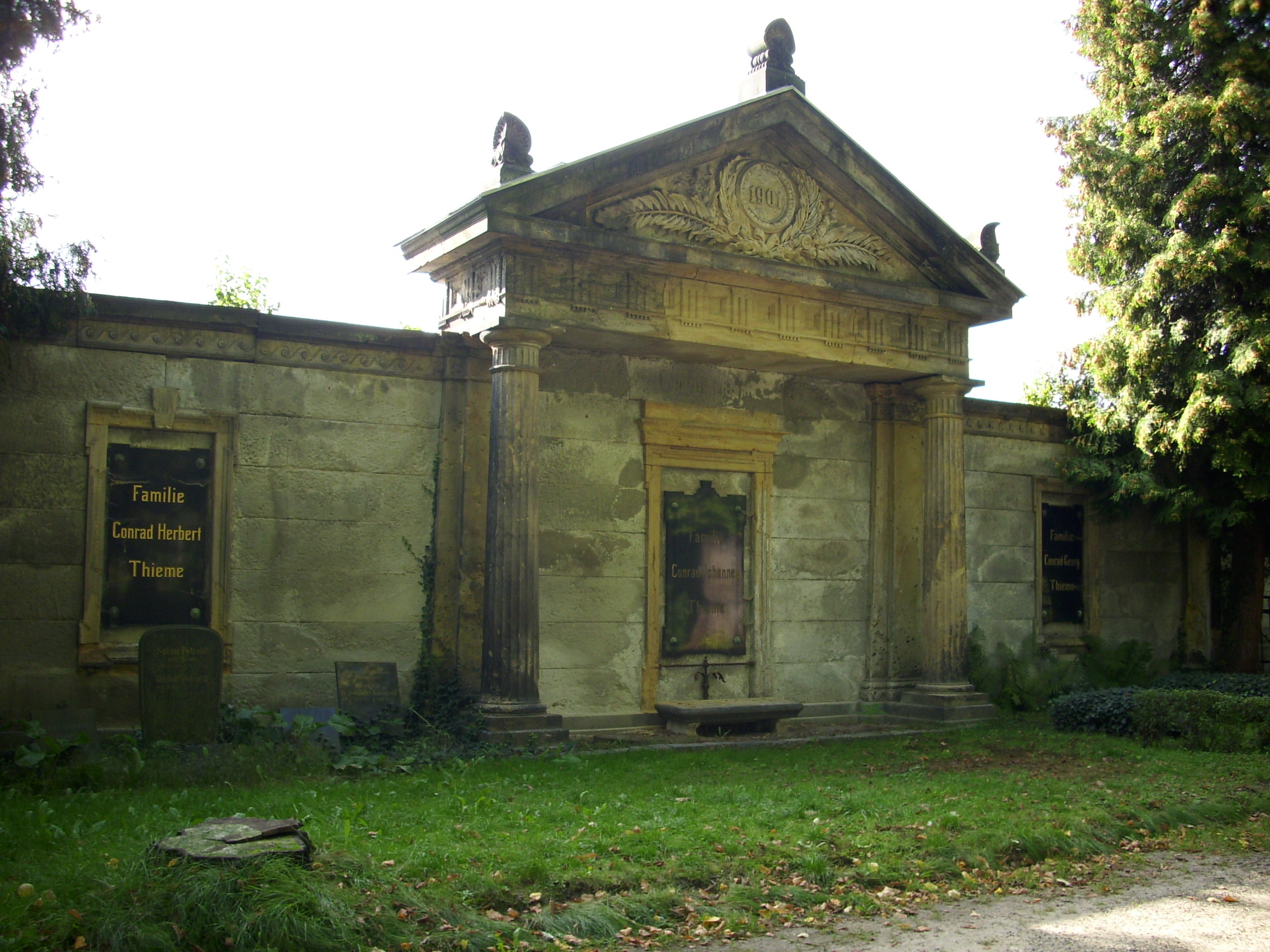
Grave of the founder of Thieme Medical Publishers

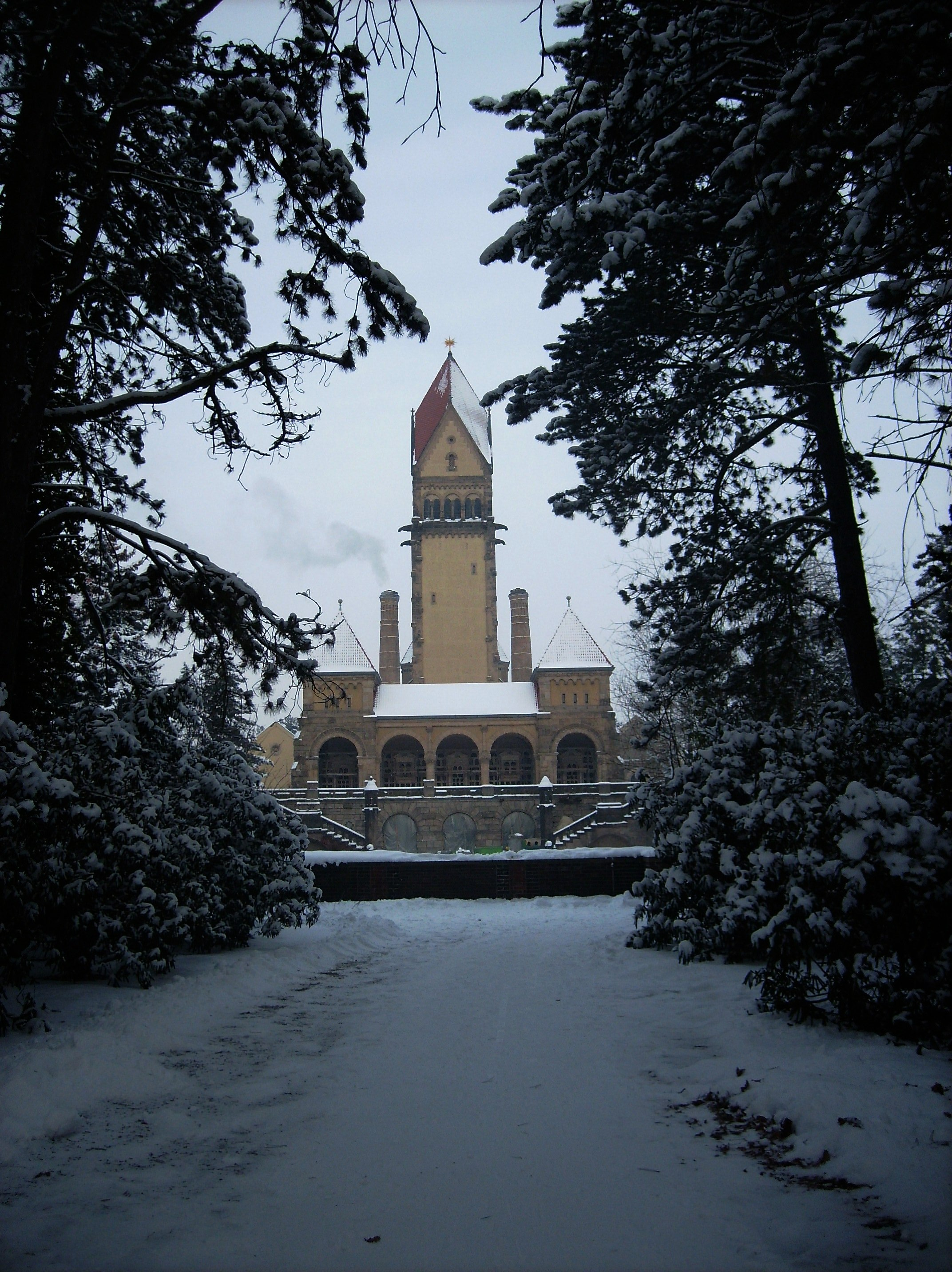
Chapel at the Südfriedhof

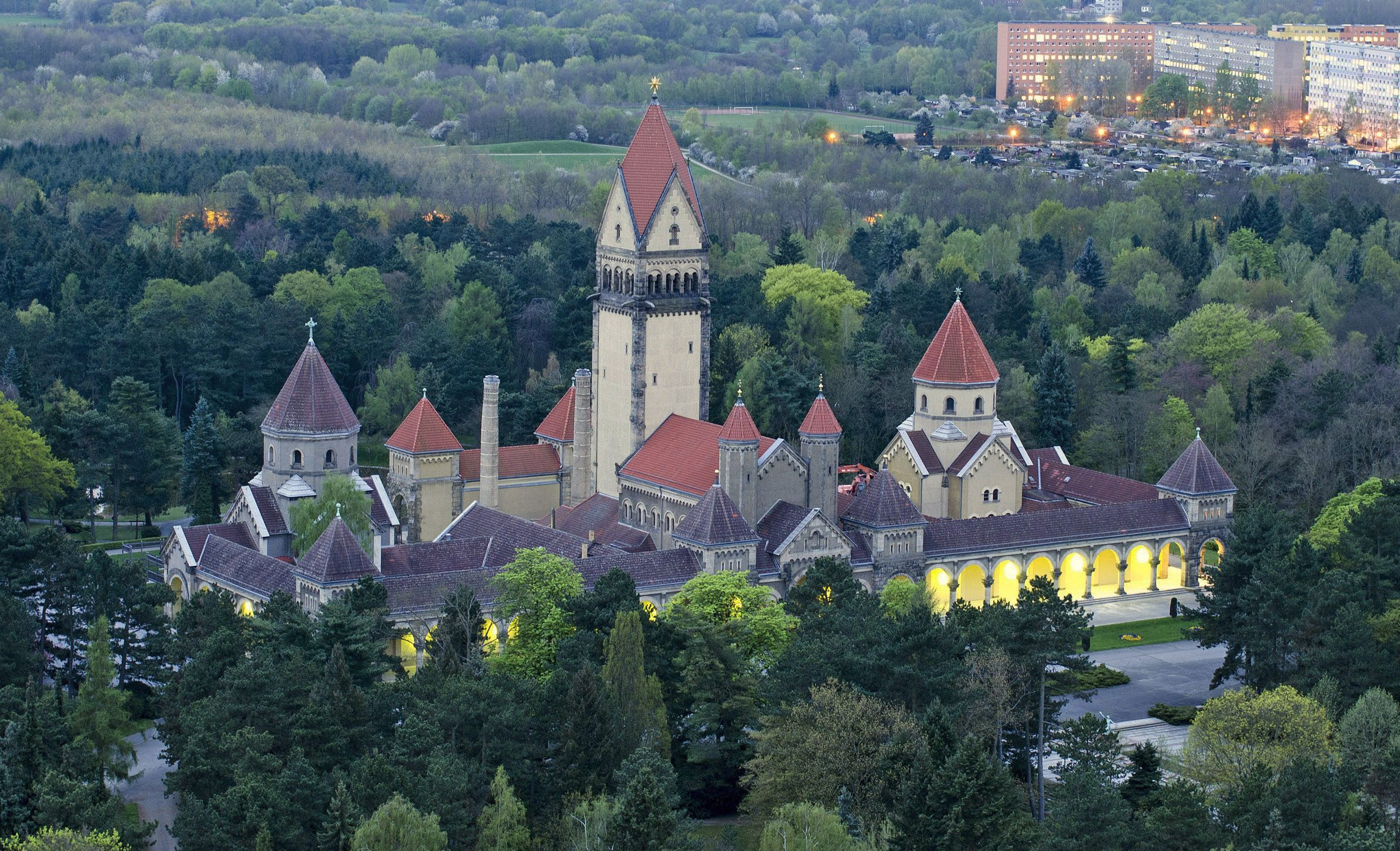
Leipzig Südfriedhof

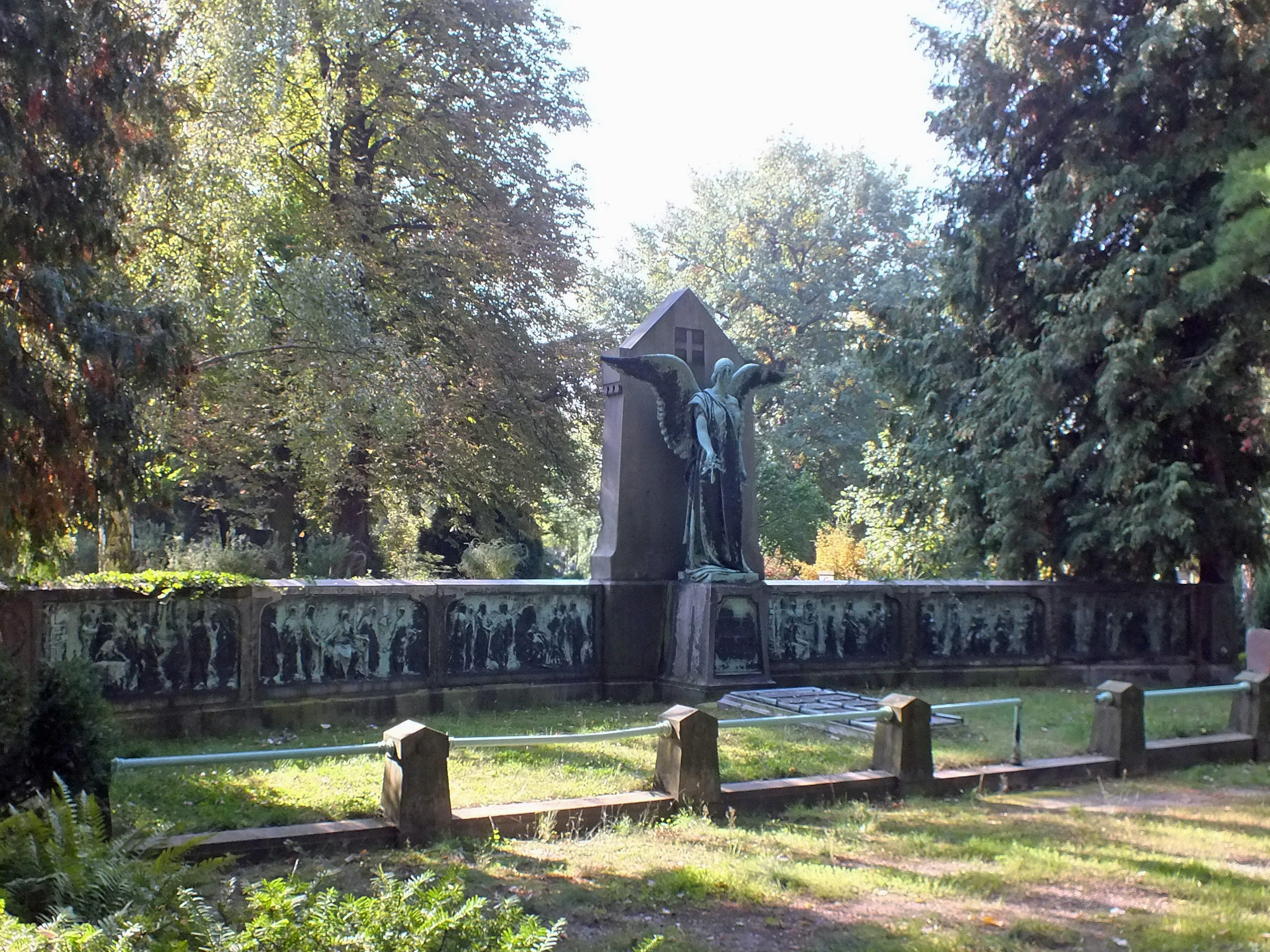
Grave of the Oelssner family with statue

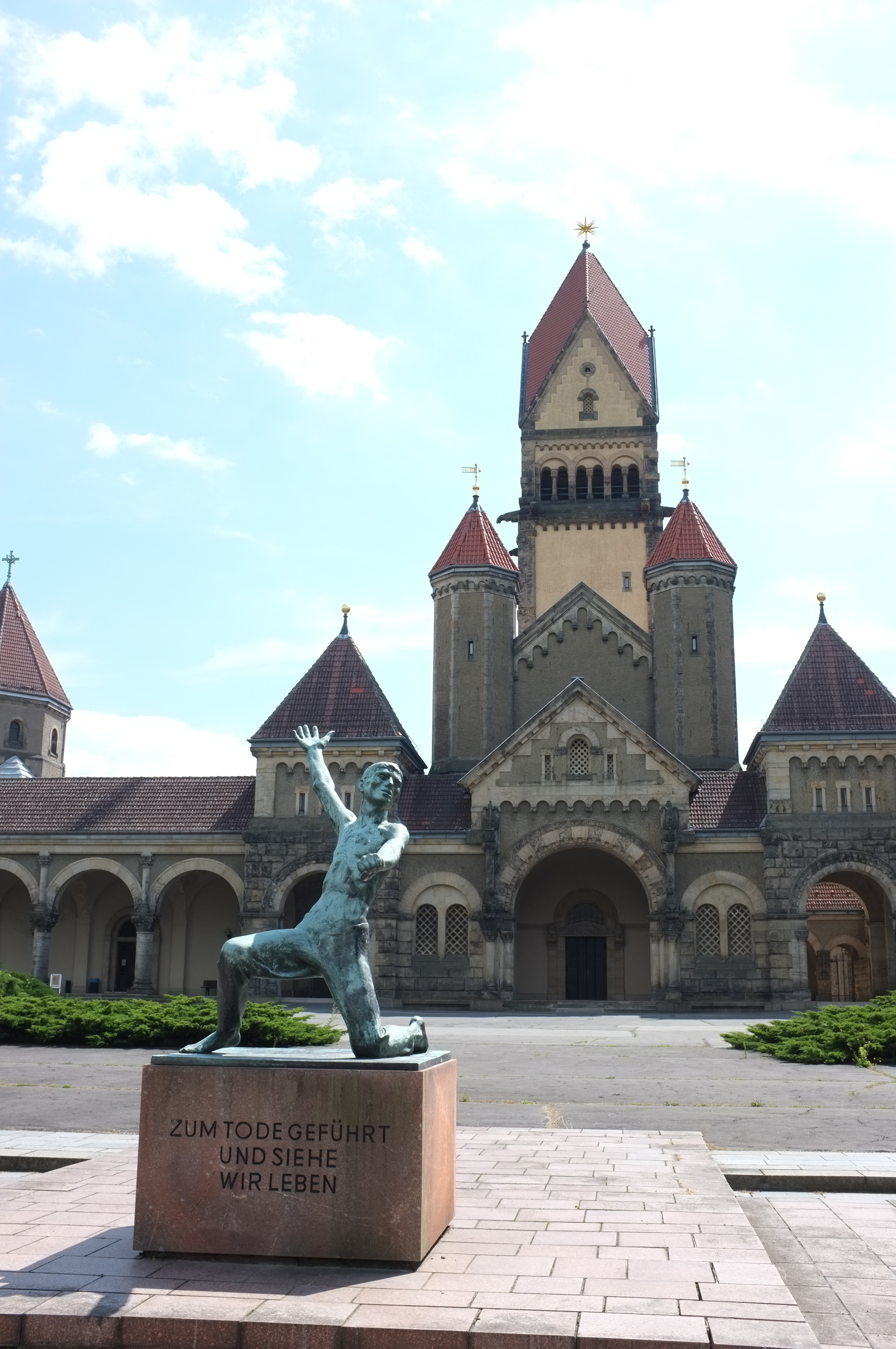
Monument for the victims of Fascism, Südfriedhof, Leipzig

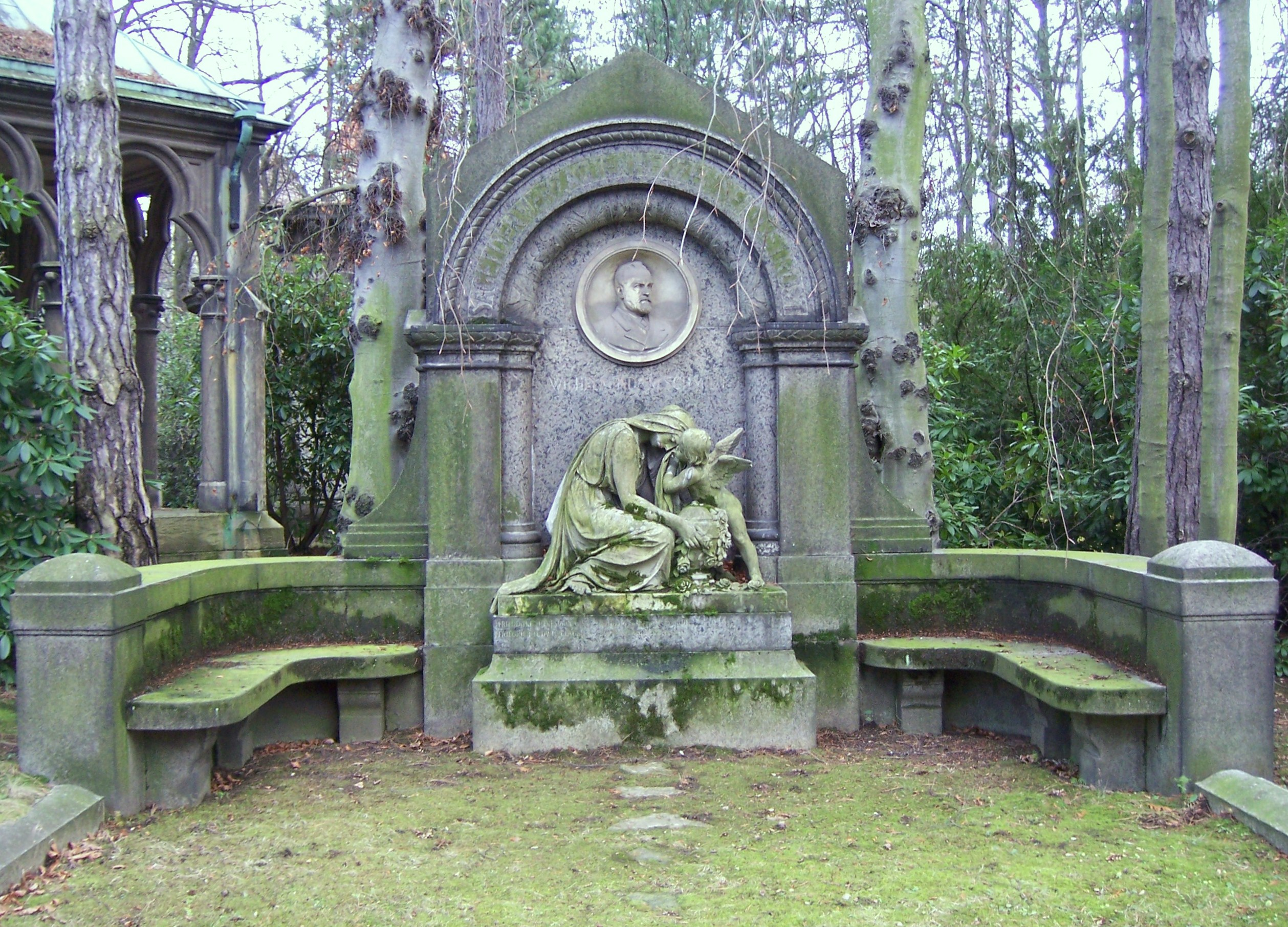
Statue on the grave of Werner Stein

== Flora and fauna ==
Due to the park-like character of the cemetery you find several kinds of trees, such as sweetgum, Mahonia, Metasequoia, Kentucky coffeetree, ginkgo and several kinds of Tilia. Furthermore, you can find about 9,000 Rhododendrons, which are up to four meters high. At the cemetery 60 nesting bird species are listed. There are numerous red squirrel and in the quiet morning and evening hours rabbits or foxes can be seen.

== See also ==
- Architecture of Leipzig

== Notable persons ==
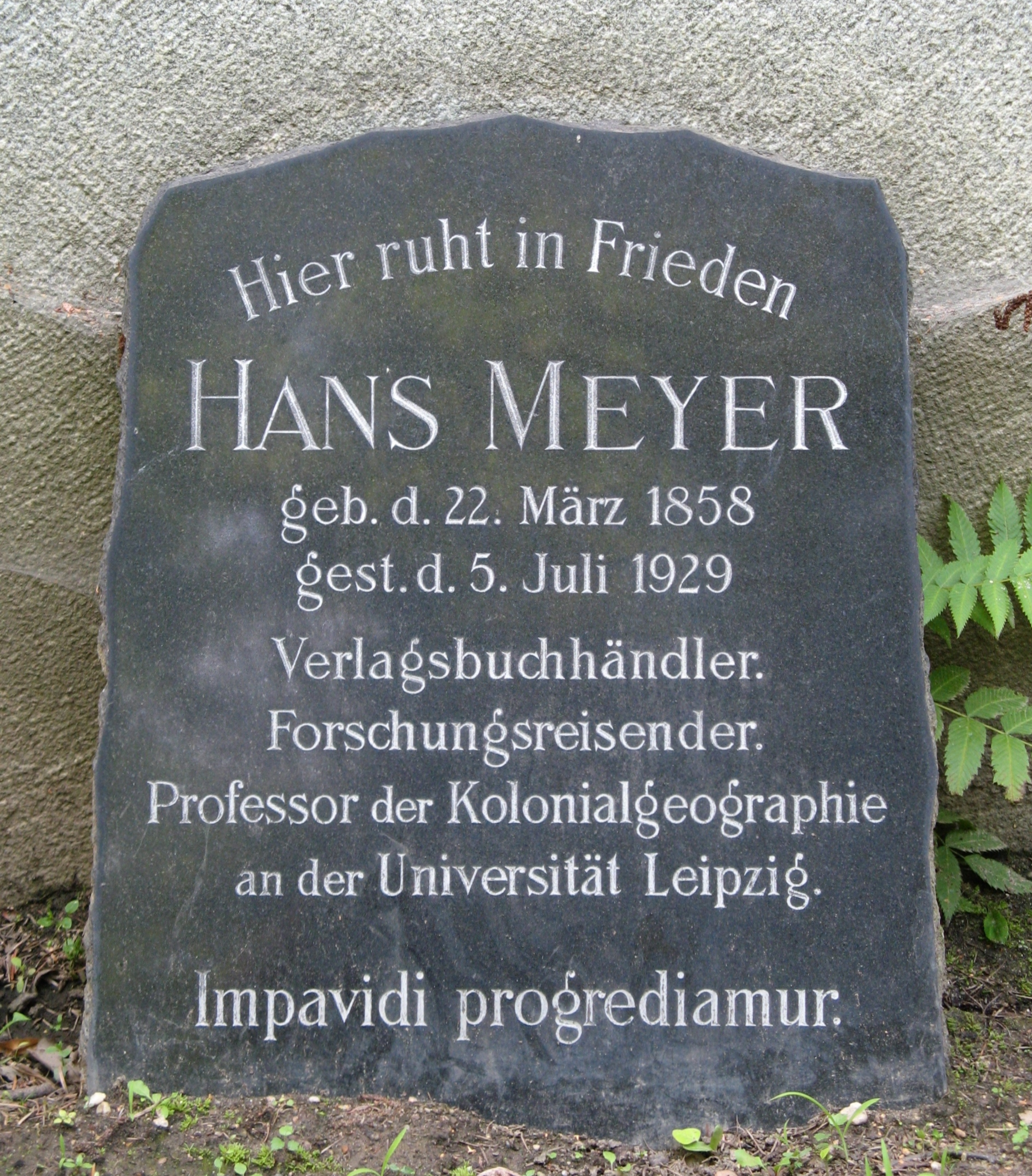
Gravestone of Hans Meyer

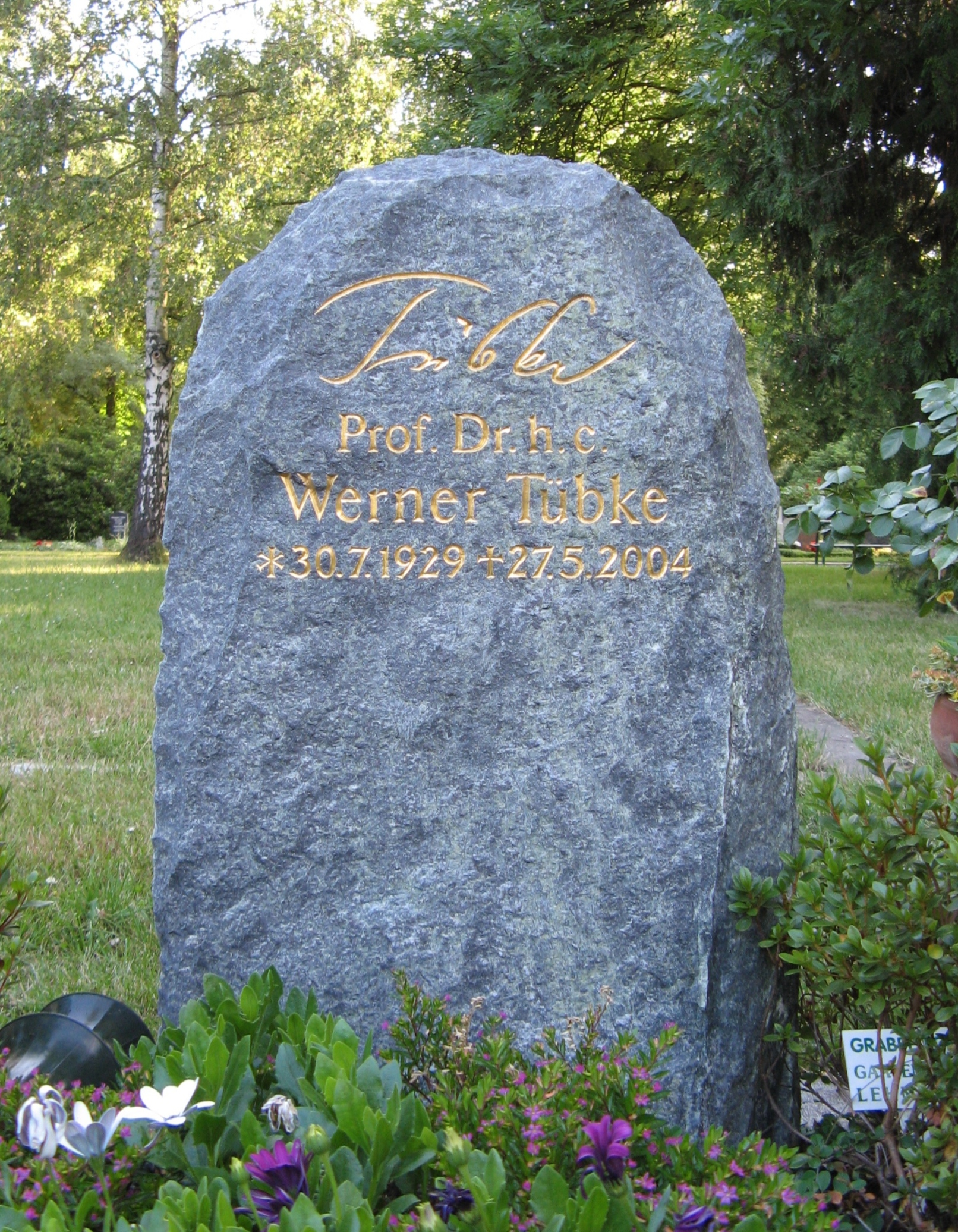
Gravestone of Werner Tübke

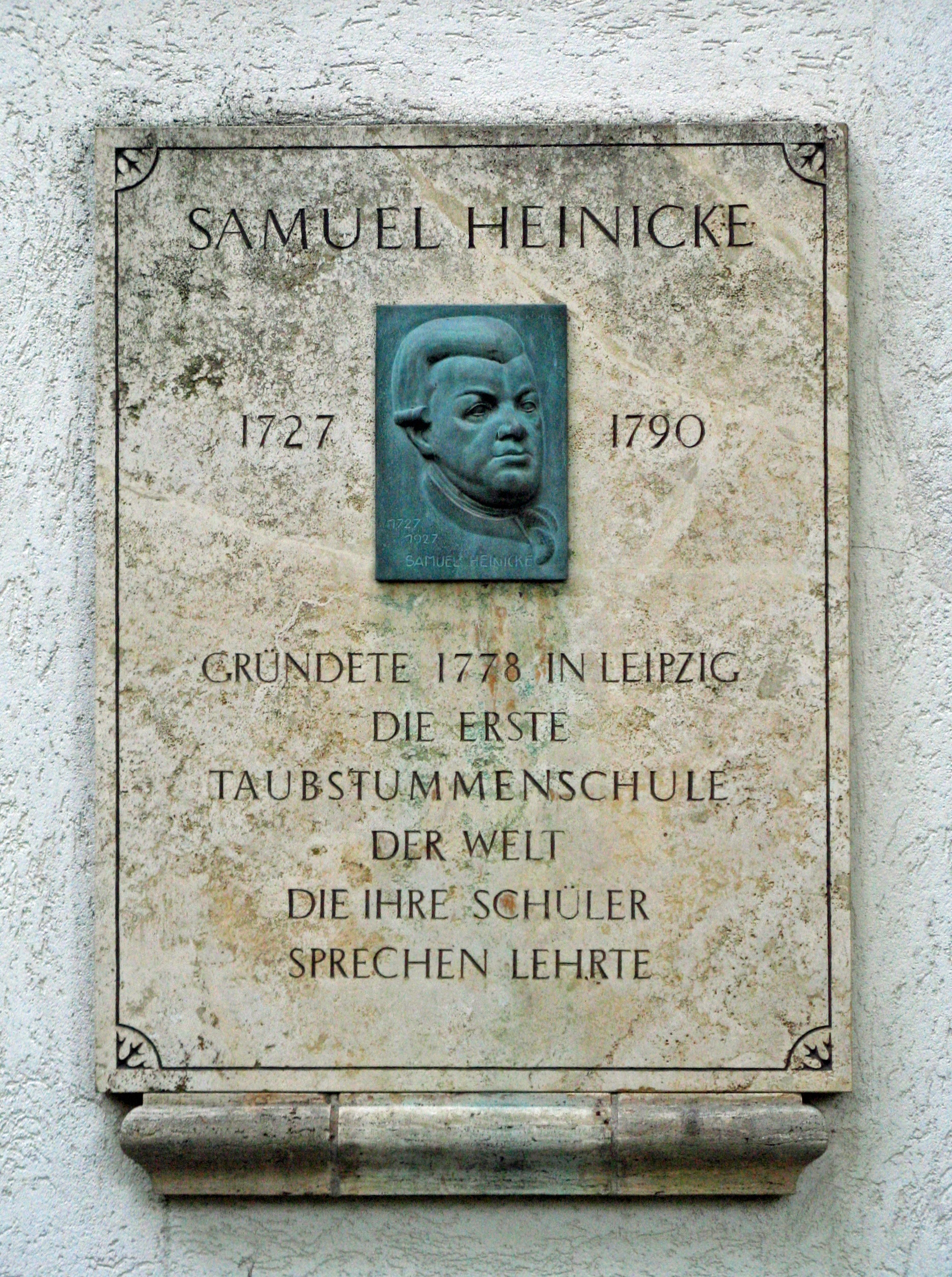
Gravestone of Samuel Heinicke

- Albrecht Alt, theologian
- Lykke Aresin, physician and sexologist
- Fritz Baedeker, publisher
- Julius Blüthner, piano maker, entrepreneur
- Max Bürger, medical doctor
- Franz Delitzsch, theologian and Hebraist
- Fred Delmare, actor
- Paul Flechsig, neuroanatomist, psychiatrist and neuropathologist
- Christian Fürchtegott Gellert, poet
- Samuel Heinicke, originator in Germany of systematic education for the deaf
- Johannes Hertel, Indologist
- Arthur Hoffmann, politician and resistance fighter
- Sigfrid Karg-Elert, composer
- Alfred Kästner, politician and resistance fighter
- Oskar Kellner, agricultural scientist, chemist, animal psychologist
- Rudolf Kittel, theologist and editor of the Biblia Hebraica
- Hugo Licht, architect of numerous buildings in Leipzig
- Julius Lips, ethnologist
- Kurt Masur, conductor
- Hans Meyer, geographer and first man on Mount Kilimanjaro
- Herrmann Julius Meyer, publisher
- Arthur von Oettingen, physicist and music theorist
- Erwin Payr, surgeon
- Carl Reinecke, composer, conductor, pianist, and composition professor
- Max Robitzsch, meteorological scientist and arctic researcher
- Renate and Roger Rössing, photographers
- Carl Seffner, sculptor, (e.g. statue of J. S. Bach in front of Thomaskirche)
- Georg Schumann, politician and resistance fighter
- Karl Straube, Thomaskantor and organist
- Karl Sudhoff, historian on medicine
- Georg Thieme, publisher and founder of Thieme Medical Publishers
- Stanislaw Trabalski, politician
- Werner Tübke, painter
- Marinus van der Lubbe, Dutch council communist accused of, and eventually executed for, setting fire to the German Reichstag building on 27 February 1933, an event known as the Reichstag fire.
- Wilhelm Wundt, medical doctor, psychologist, physiologist, philosopher, known today as one of the founding figures of modern psychology
- Erich Zeigner, politician
