= Old Bach Monument =

Monument in Leipzig, Germany

- Altes Bachdenkmal
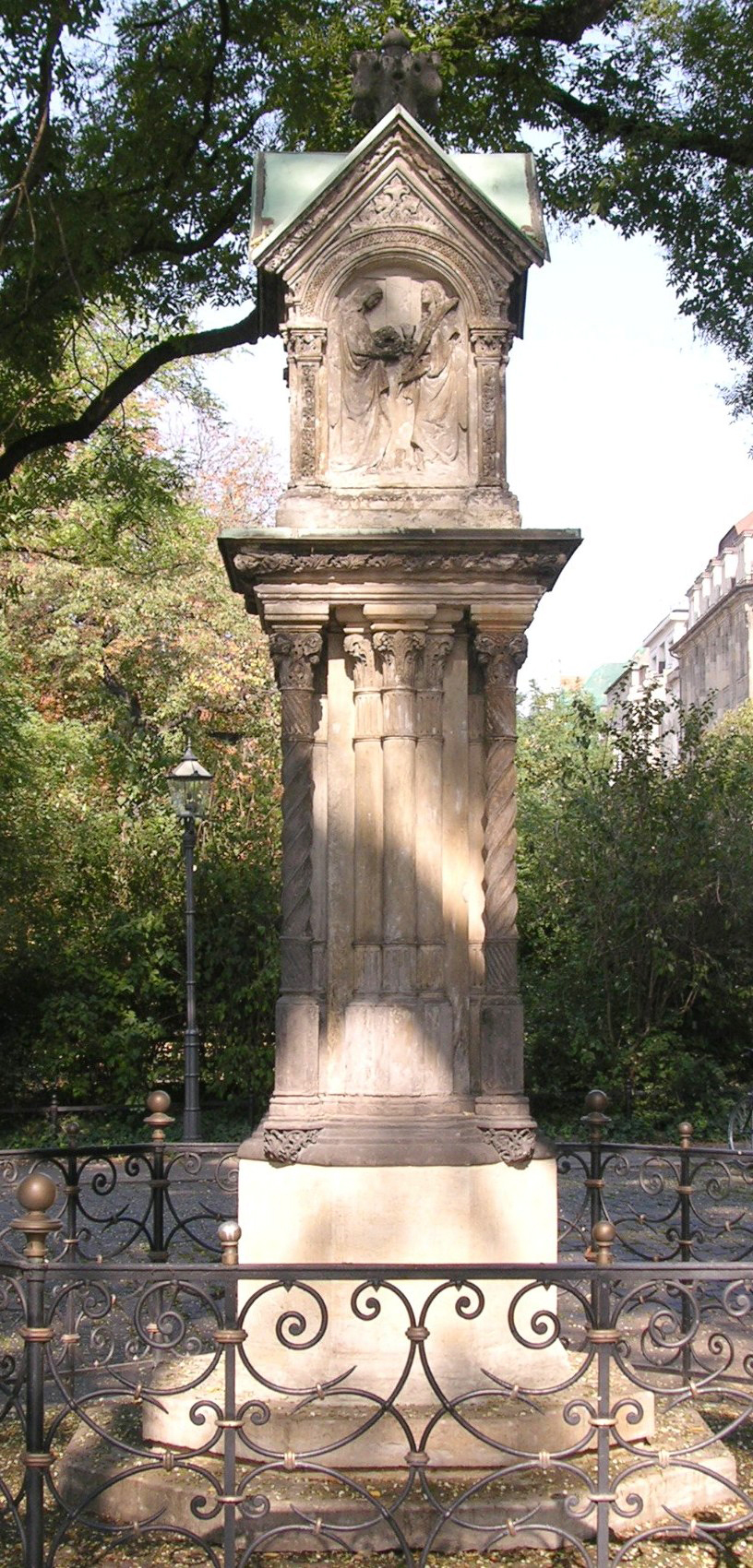
- Old Bach Monument, from the south
- Interactive map of Old Bach Monument
- Location: Leipzig, Germany
- Coordinates: 51°20′19.7″N 12°22′17.2″E
- Dedicated date: 1843
- Restored date: 2005

The Old Bach Monument (in German: Altes Bachdenkmal) stands near St. Thomas Church in Leipzig, Saxony, Germany. It is the world's oldest monument to Johann Sebastian Bach. Donated by Felix Mendelssohn, it was dedicated in 1843. It was designed by Eduard Bendemann, Ernst Rietschel, and Julius Hübner. The monument was executed by Leipzig sculptor Hermann Knaur. Since its construction, it has been restored several times, most recently in 2005. The term "Old" in the name distinguishes it from the New Bach Monument (in German: Neues Bachdenkmal) in Leipzig, also known as the "Statue of J. S. Bach".

== History ==
The initiative to erect a monument to Bach in Leipzig came in 1840 from the composer Felix Mendelssohn, who was then the director of the Leipzig Gewandhaus Orchestra. The monument was designed by the Dresden painter Eduard Bendemann, further developed with the collaboration of his colleagues Ernst Rietschel and Julius Hübner, executed in Elbe sandstone by the sculptor Hermann Knaur, and erected in 1843 in its present location, which at that time was directly behind the St. Thomas School.

On 6 August 1840, Mendelssohn gave a solo organ concert in Leipzig's St. Thomas Church, playing six works by Johann Sebastian Bach, beginning and ending with his own improvisations. This concert was followed by a performance of the St Matthew Passion on 4 April 1841 and, on the day of the monument's unveiling in 1843, a concert with representative vocal and instrumental works by Bach. The monument was financed primarily from the net proceeds of the three concerts, with Mendelssohn contributing the remaining amount from his private fortune.

The monument was ceremoniously unveiled on 23 April 1843. After a concert in the Leipzig Gewandhaus, which featured exclusively Bach's works, the Thomanerchor boys' choir, partly reinforced by amateur singers and accompanied by a wind choir made up of members of the Gewandhaus Orchestra, sang two chorales and Bach's motet Singet dem Herrn ein neues Lied, BWV 225 at the monument. In addition, the government and city councillor Friedrich Heinrich Wilhelm Demuth delivered a ceremonial address.

== Design ==
An octagonal sandstone base stands on two octagonal stone slabs, supporting a cantoned pillar surrounded by four narrower columns, each spiralling in the centre. These five columns support a common square capital, upon which the actual monument, designed like a house with a square floor plan, stands. It is formed by four Romanesque arches, each surmounted by a triangular gable open at the bottom. The gables converge to form a roof and bear a stone finial that crowns and completes the monument. The monument is surrounded by an octagonal iron fence.

=== Finial ===
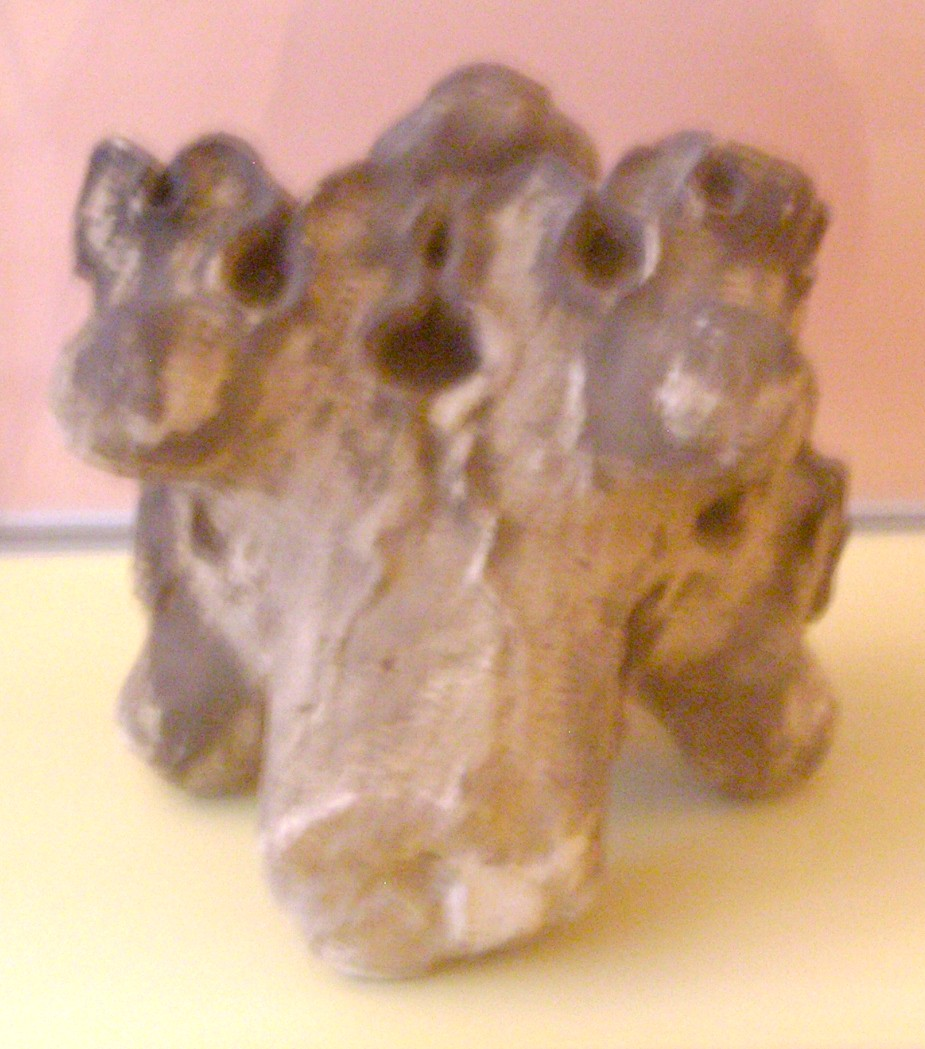
Second finial in the Bach Archive Leipzig

The finial has been replaced and its shape altered at least twice since the monument's erection. The second finial has been in the Bach Archive in Leipzig since the early 1980s. A wood engraving shows that the first finial was significantly larger than the current one.

=== Relief ===
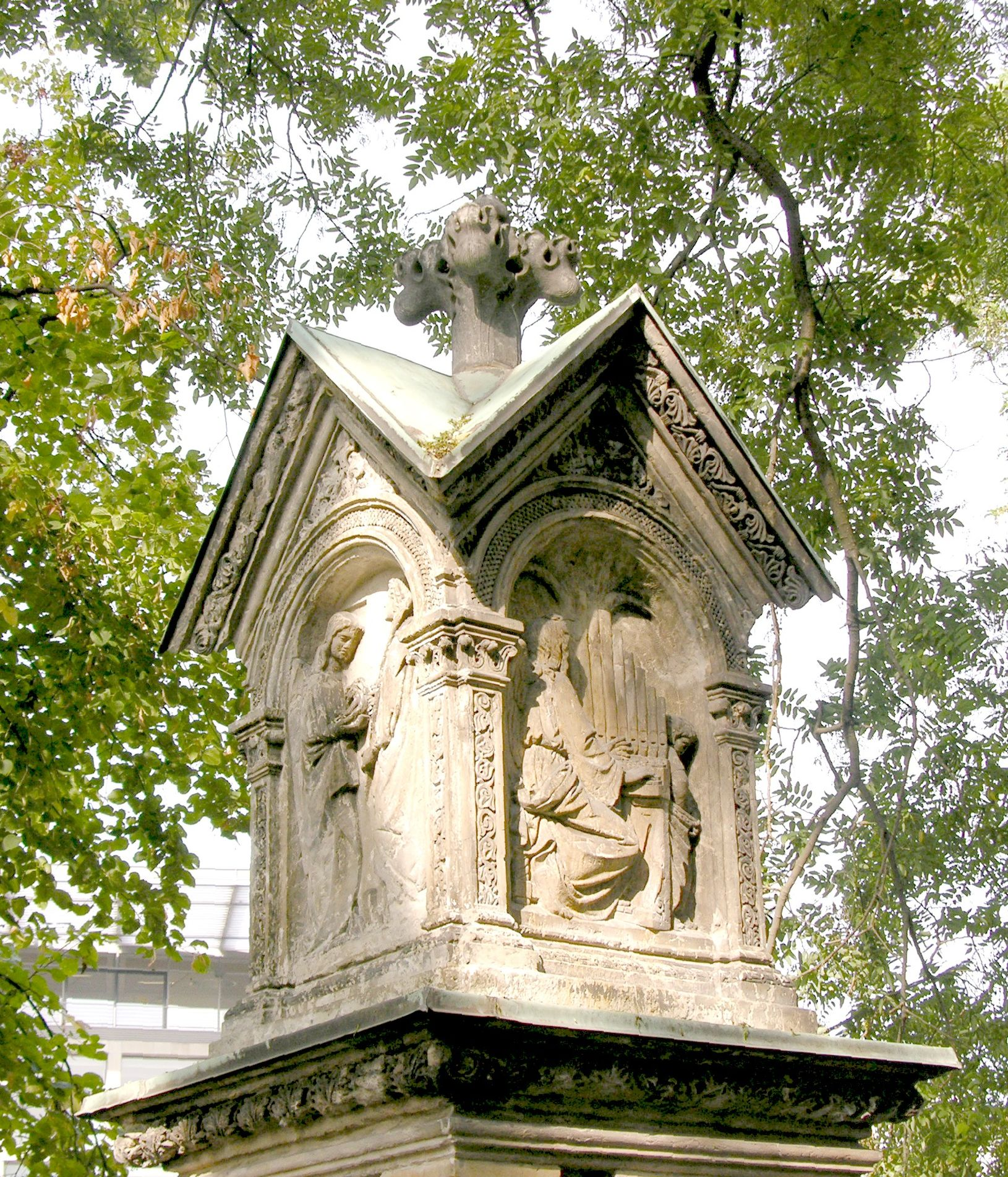
Two sides of the relief

The relief consists of a four-sided sandstone with half-relief depictions, each under a Romanesque arch. Each side is covered by a small, copper ridge roof and features a different motif:

North: Bach's bust.

West: An angel teaching boys how to sing.

South: Two angels beneath a cross, one holding a crown of thorns, the other a palm branch and chalice.

East: An angel playing the organ with a bellows treadle.

=== Column section ===
The column section consists of a total of 16 columns, with eight in the centre and one smooth column on each of the four sides. A twisted column stands at each of the four corners. These all have Corinthian capitals, three round sections and one octagonal section.

=== Base ===
The base is octagonal and has three steps. The top part of the base is made of metal and is decorated at the four corners.

== Gallery ==
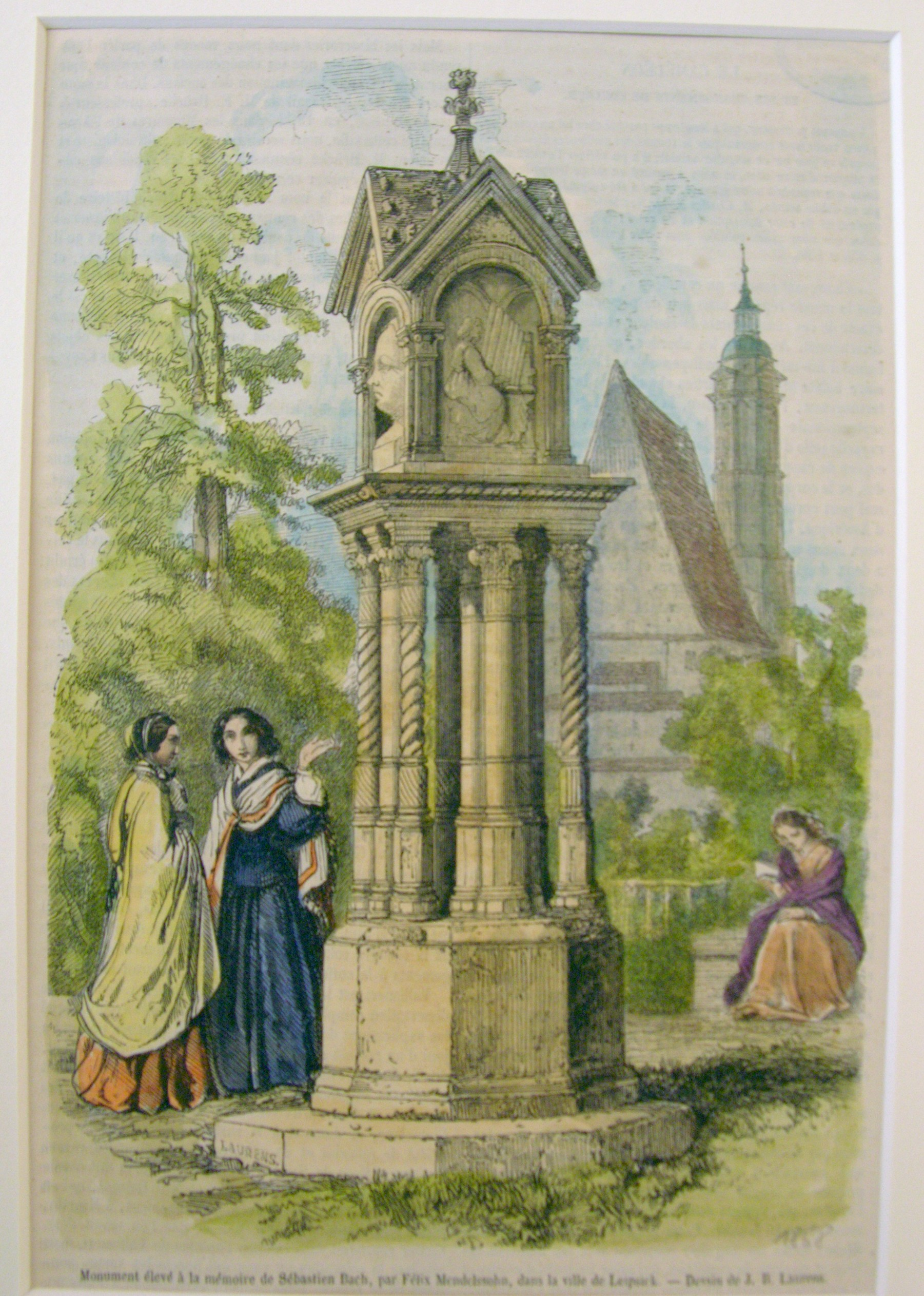
Woodcut after a watercolour by Eduard Bendemann, 1850

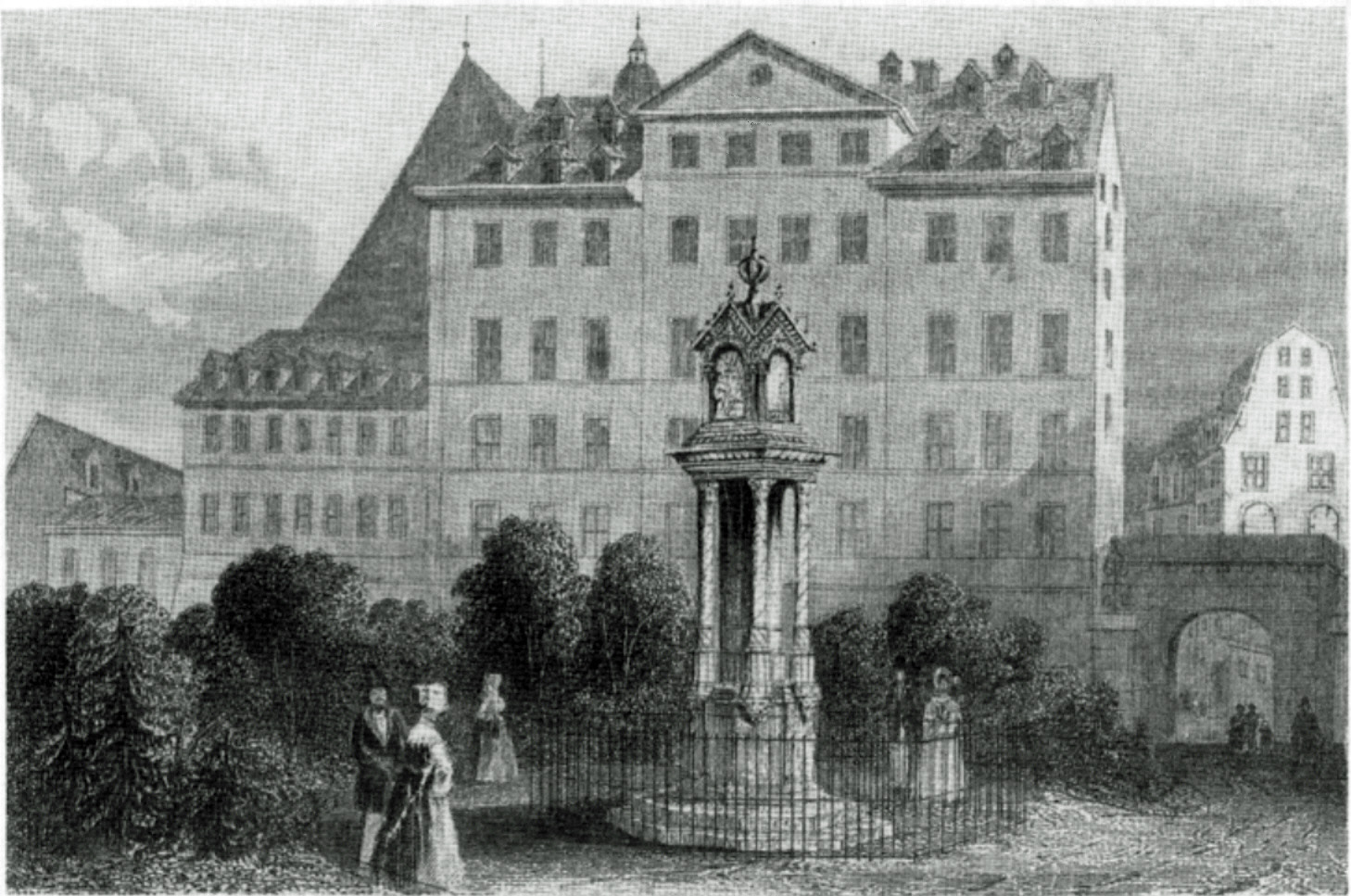
Engraving by Albert Henry Payne from Leipzig Around 1860

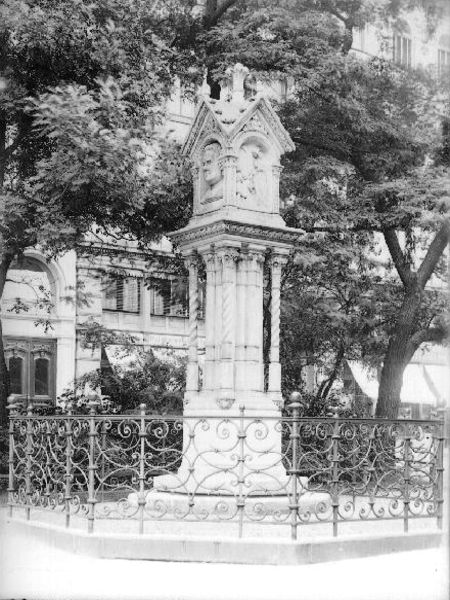
Photo by Hermann Walter, 1880

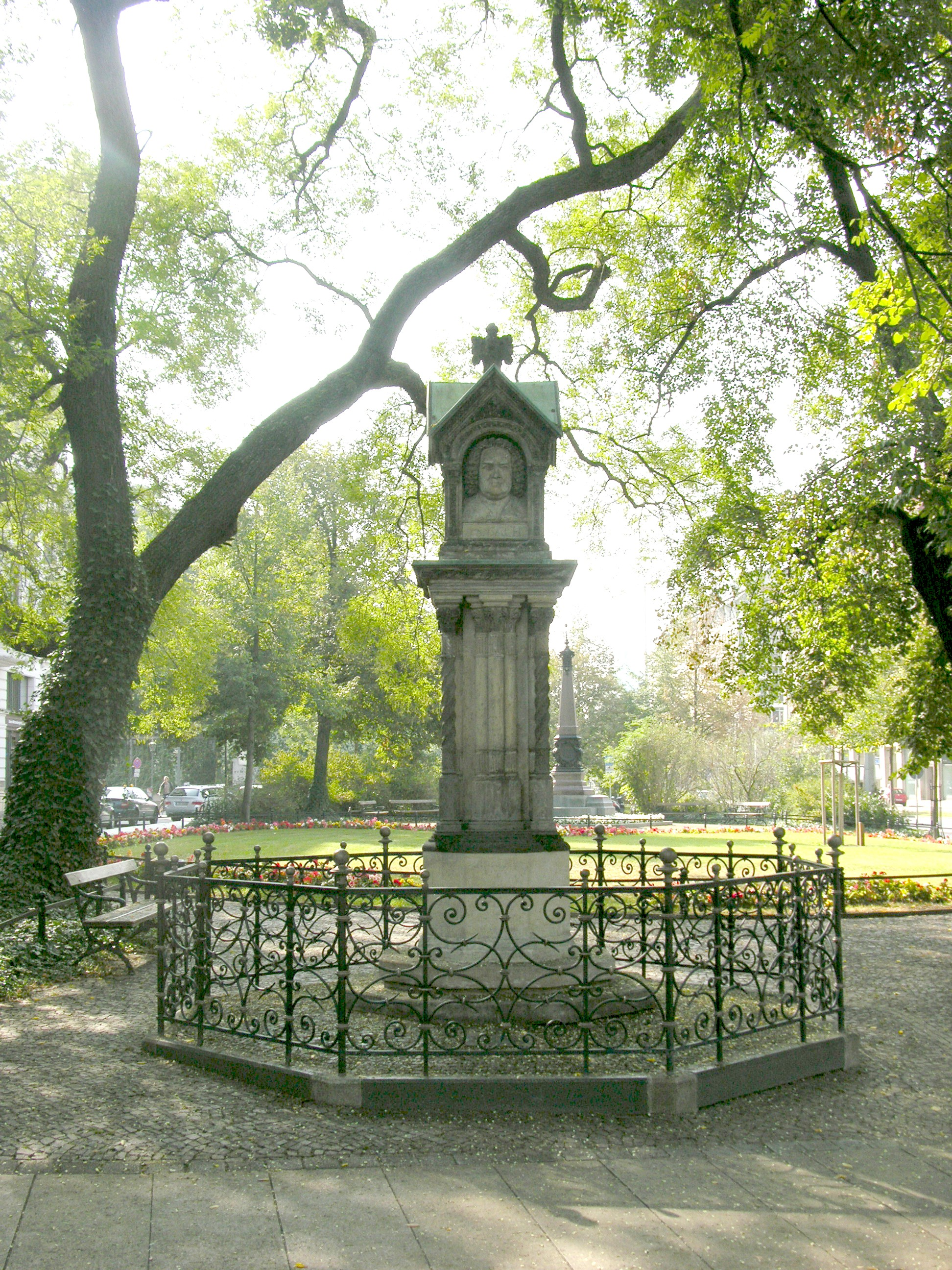
Today's view from the north

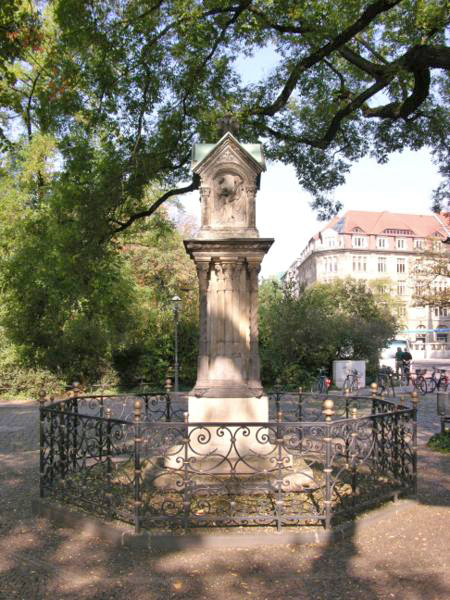
Today's view from the south
