= Seffner =

Seffner may refer to:

- Seffner, Florida
- Carl Seffner (1861–1932), German sculptor
