= Franz Dominic Grassi =

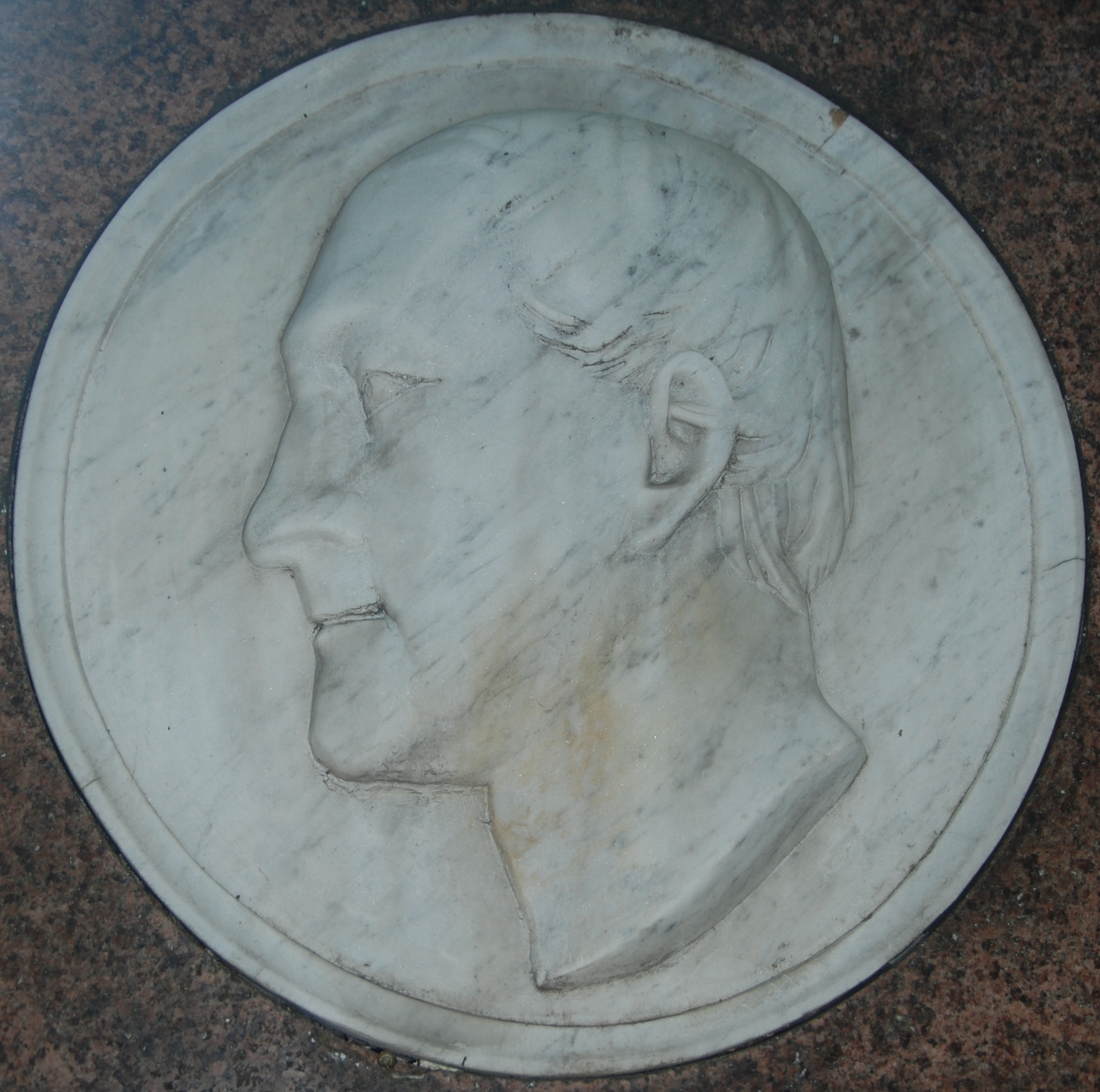
- Relief at his grave on the Alter Johannisfriedhof
- Born: 11 May 1801; Leipzig, Electorate of Saxony
- Died: 14 November 1880 (aged 79); Leipzig, Kingdom of Saxony, German Empire
- Burial place: Alter Johannisfriedhof, Leipzig; 51.336976°N 12.389459°E
- Occupation: Businessman
- Known for: Philanthropy

Franz Dominic Grassi (* 11 May 1801 in Leipzig; † 14 November 1880 Leipzig) was a merchant in Leipzig who was of Italian descent. As a result of his extensive heritage given to the city, numerous monuments and buildings were constructed.

== Life ==
He was born as the son of Franz Josef Grassi (merchant and financier) and his wife, Rossi née? The family originated from Lucca in central Italy and immigrated to Leipzig. After his commercial training and numerous trips abroad, he founded his own trading firm for Russian products, indigo dye and tropical fruits in Leipzig. After the death of his father in 1847, he operated mostly in the speculation and exchange business. After the death of his mother in 1854, he retired completely from active commercial life.

Grassi remained unmarried all his life. He was a theatre and horse lover, and therefore one of the founders of the Leipzig racing club. He also supported Leipzig citizens, who were in emergency situations. Grassi was also popularly called "The Wood Sucker" because of his habit of chewing on a toothpick.

== Legacy ==
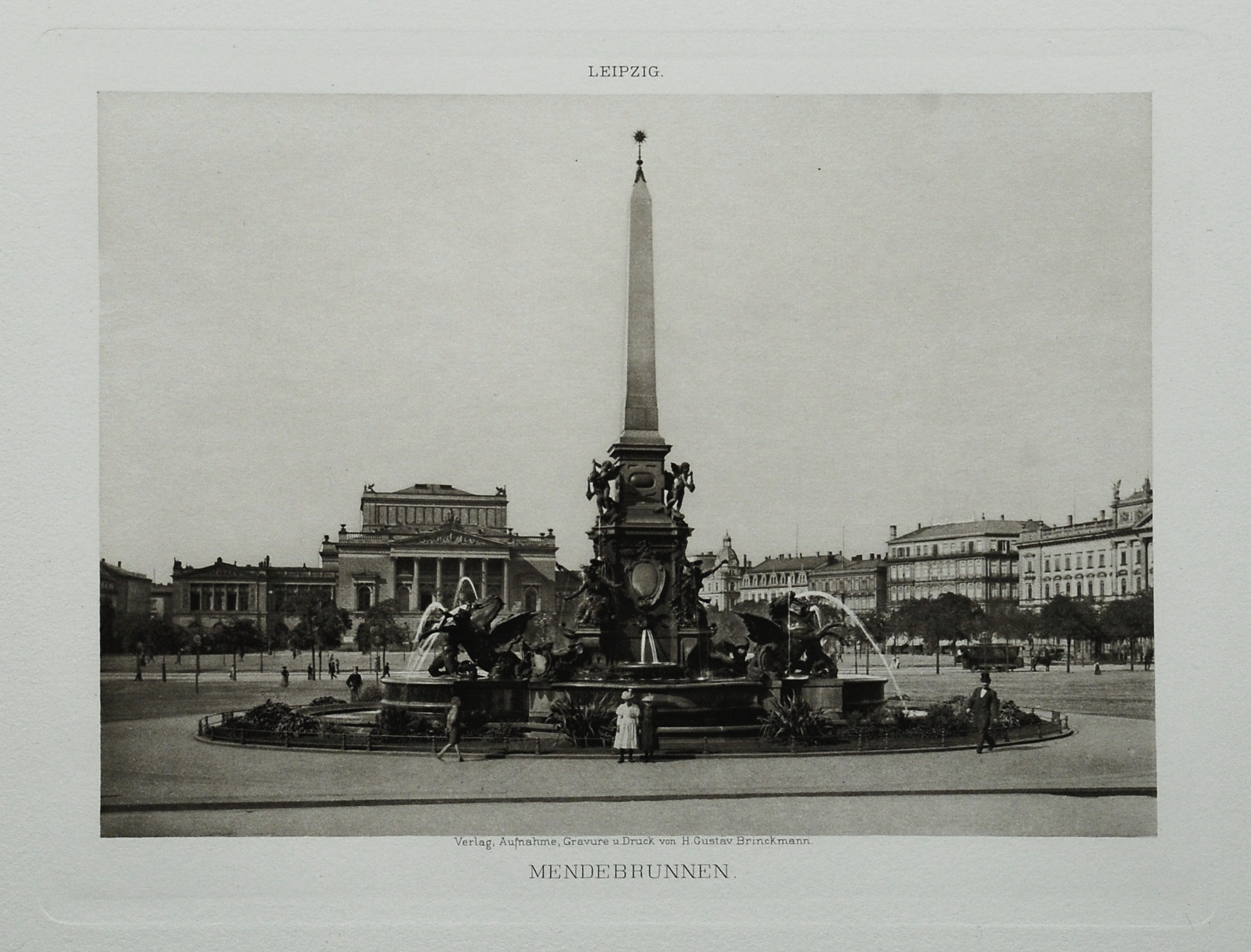
Mendebrunnen at Augustusplatz in 1898

Although Grassi largely considered in his testament even distant relatives, godchildren and servants, he left the city a fortune of 2.327 million Gold Mark (approx. 23 million euros). From this property, numerous construction projects, parks and monuments have been supported, some of which were destroyed during World War II (New Gewandhaus and the museums on Augustusplatz. Of the remaining buildings is the Grassi Museum at Johannisplatz, the "Old Grassi Museum" (now Leipzig city library) and the Mendebrunnen mention. Furthermore, parts of the money were used for the erection of the Völkerschlachtdenkmal, and the statues of Johann Sebastian Bach and Johann Wolfgang von Goethe.

== Posthumous Honours ==
Since 1883, street C of the southwestern development plan in the then newly created Musikviertel quarter in Leipzig has borne the name Grassistrasse, in honour of Franz Dominic Grassi.

Since 2002, the Italian Chamber of Commerce in Germany and the TU Chemnitz endow the "Franz Dominic Grassi Prize" for services to promote the German-Italian trade and economic.

== See also ==
- Statue of J. S. Bach
- Goethe Monument (Leipzig)
