= Statue of J. S. Bach =

1908 monument to J. S. Bach in Leipzig

- Neues Bachdenkmal
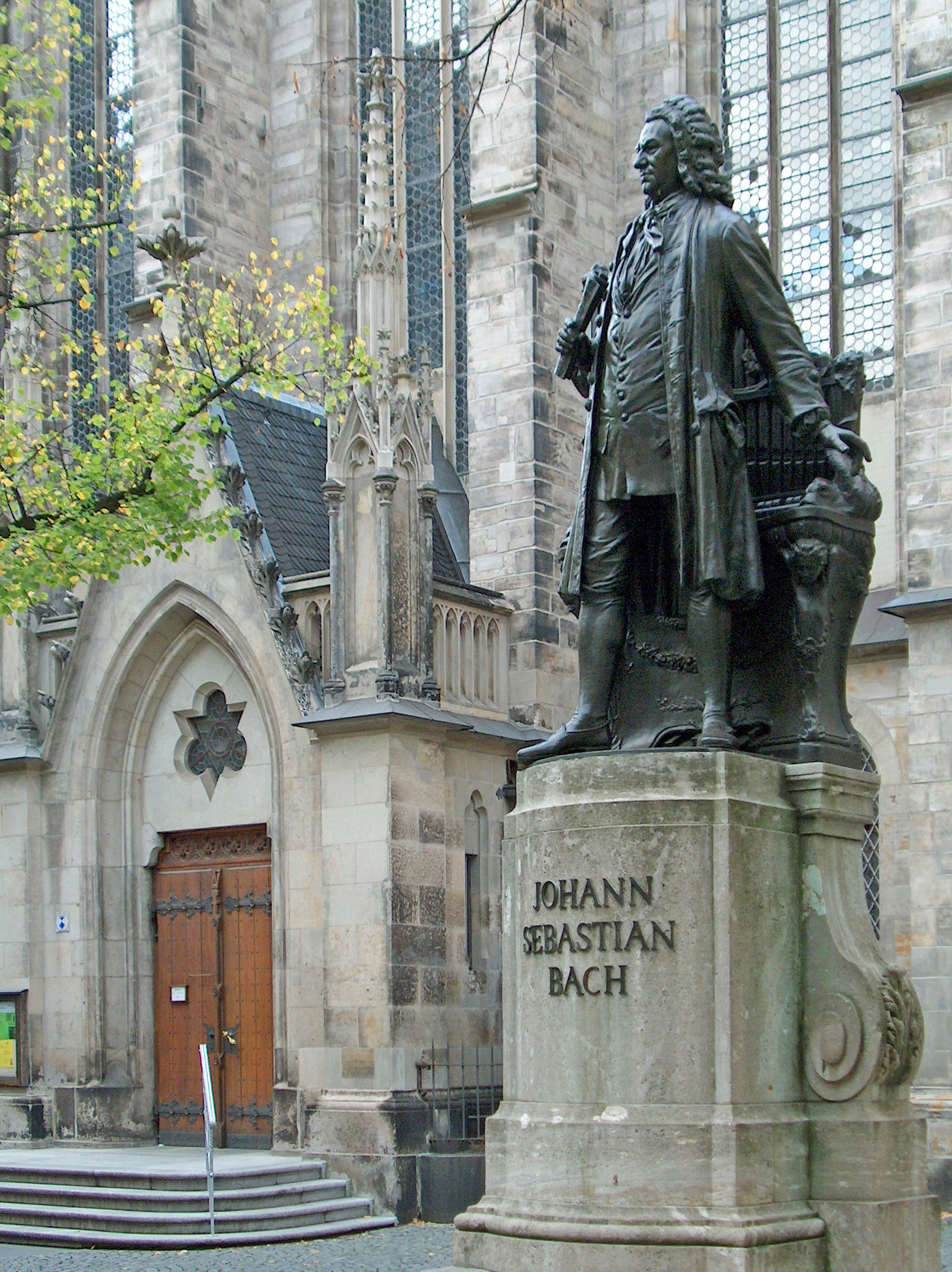
- Statue of J. S. Bach on the St. Thomas Church Square in Leipzig (2007)
- Interactive map of Statue of J. S. Bach
- Location: Leipzig, Saxony, Germany
- Coordinates: 51°20′20.8″N 12°22′21.5″E
- Designer: Carl Seffner
- Type: Statue on a pedestal
- Material: Bronze (statue); Muschelkalk (pedestal)
- Height: 2.45 m (8 ft) (statue); 3.2 m (10 ft) (pedestal)
- Opening date: 17 May 1908
- Dedicated to: Johann Sebastian Bach

The Statue of J. S. Bach (German: Neues Bachdenkmal, lit. 'New Bach monument') is a monument to the composer and Thomaskantor Johann Sebastian Bach, located near the south wall of St. Thomas Church in Leipzig, Saxony, Germany.

== Description ==
A 2.45 m (8 ft) tall bronze statue of the composer stands on a 3.2 m (10 ft) tall pedestal designed by Otto Wilhelm Scharenberg. The statue was created by sculptor Carl Seffner with funds donated to the city of Leipzig by Franz Dominic Grassi. The composer stands in front of an organ, a roll of a musical score in his right hand, his left hand reaching for the organ. On the back of the organ is a bas-relief of the old St. Thomas School building which stood on the western part of the square and was demolished in 1902. The architectural style is baroque revival, but the organ has Jugendstil decorations.

== History ==
The idea of erecting a new monument to Bach arose in Leipzig in preparation for the celebration of the 200th anniversary of Bach's birth in 1885. However, it was not until the reconstruction of the St. John's Church in 1894, when Bach's remains were discovered and identified, that the idea began to become a reality. The composer's remains were reburied in the church crypt together with those of Christian Fürchtegott Gellert. At the same time, it was proposed to create a sculptural image of Bach, symmetrically positioned in relation to Gellert's epitaph already there. However, the idea of erecting a monument in the church was soon abandoned, as a result of which a discussion began in 1899 about the location of the monument; the square in front of St. Thomas' Church was one of the best options, because it was here that Bach spent a significant part of his Leipzig years. Finally, in 1901–1902, the city received 5,000 gold marks from Franz Dominic Grassi's fortune for construction. In 1906, it was also finally decided to erect a monument in front of the St. Thomas Church. The new monument was inaugurated on 17 May 1908 on the site of the former Leibniz monument.

== Various ==
The Leibniz monument, unveiled in 1883, was moved to the courtyard of the Paulinum (the main building of Leipzig University).

In Leipzig, there is also the Old Bach Monument, unveiled in 1843, which is located in the Promenadenring on the west side of the St. Thomas Church, in a distance of just 50 m (164 ft) of the statue of J. S. Bach.

=== Open-air music ===
In 1979, the first open-air summer concert in classical music took place in front of the statue of J. S. Bach. This started a tradition with a lot of free concerts of international artists every year.
