= St. Thomas Church, Leipzig =

Coordinates: 51°20′21″N 12°22′21″E

Thomaskirche St. Thomas Church
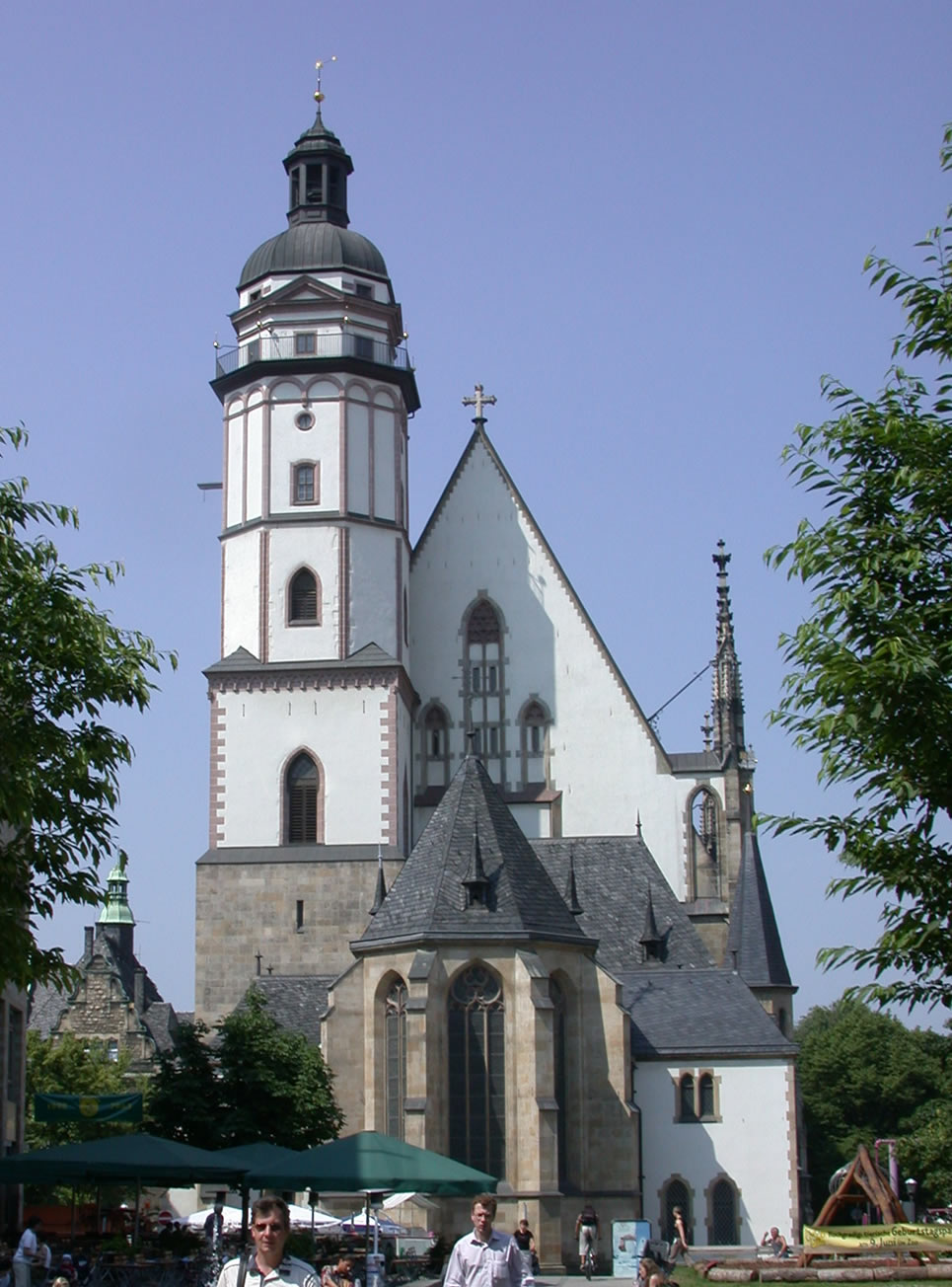
- Thomaskirche; St. Thomas Church
- Location: Leipzig
- Country: Germany
- Denomination: Lutheran
- Previous denomination: Roman Catholic
- Website: www.thomaskirche.org

History
- Status: Parish church

Architecture
- Functional status: Active
- Style: Gothic; Romanesque (choir/nave)
- Years built: 12th century 1884–1889 (renovations)

Administration
- Division: Evangelical-Lutheran Church of Saxony

Clergy
- Pastor: Dr. Janning Hoenen

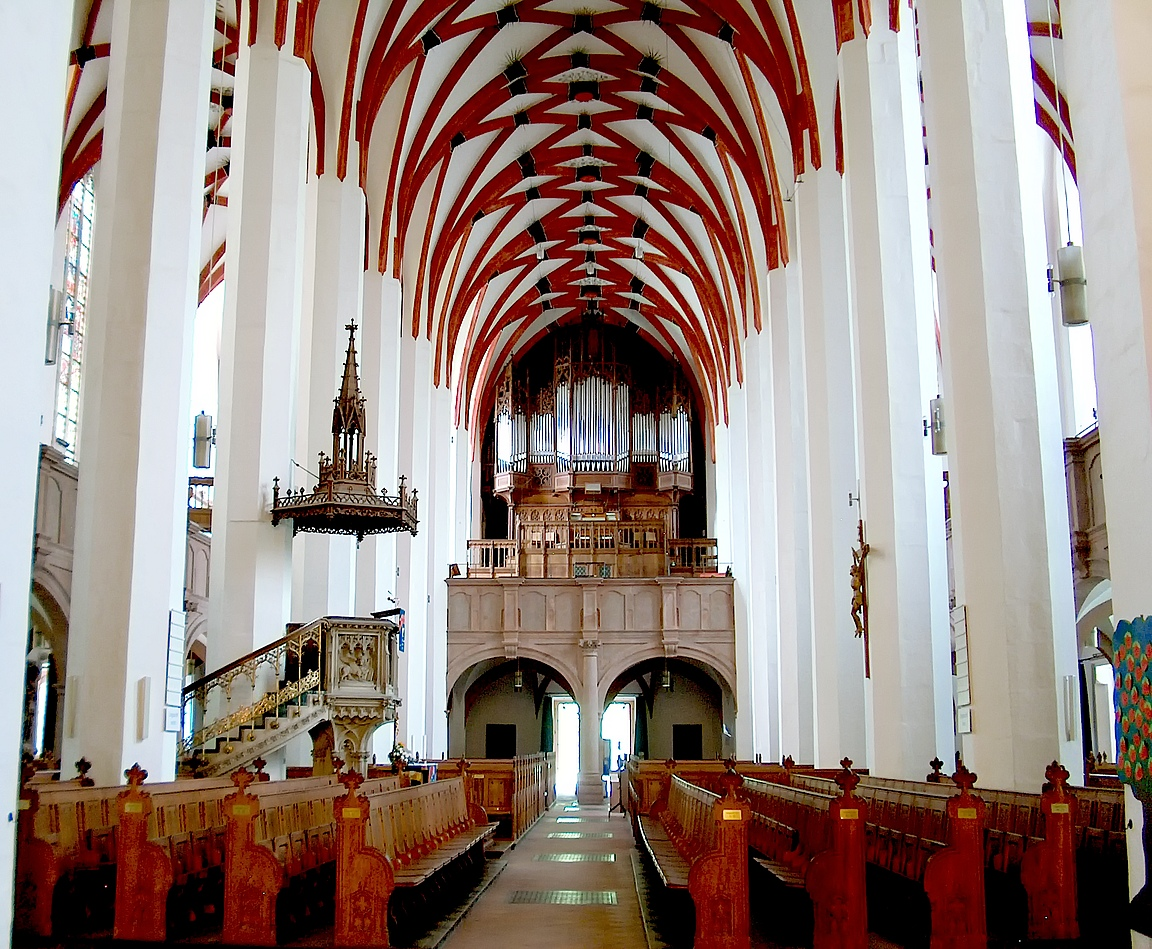
Interior, 2008

The St. Thomas Church (German: Thomaskirche) is a Lutheran church in Leipzig, Germany, located at the western part of the inner city ring road in Leipzig's central district. Martin Luther preached in the church in 1539. It is associated with several well-known composers, especially Johann Sebastian Bach, who was its Thomaskantor (music director) from 1723 until his death in 1750. Bach is buried in the church.

Although rebuilt over the centuries and damaged by Allied incendiary bombs in 1943, the church mainly retains the character of a late-Gothic hall church. The Thomanerchor, the church choir, likely founded in 1212, is an internationally known boys' choir.

== History ==
The current property was the site of a church at least since the 12th century. Foundations of a Romanesque building were discovered in the choir and crossing of the current church.

Between 1212 and 1222, the earlier structure became the church of the new St. Thomas college of Augustinian canons founded by Markgraf Dietrich von Meissen. This college later became the core of the University of Leipzig (founded in 1409).

In 1217, the minnesinger Heinrich von Morungen bequeathed to the church a relic of St. Thomas as he entered the order of canons after an apocryphal trip to India.

In 1355, the Romanesque choir was changed to Gothic style. Following an inflow of wealth into Leipzig from the discovery of silver in the Ore Mountains (Erzgebirge), the Romanesque nave was demolished and replaced between 1482 and 1496 by the current late-Gothic hall church.

The current building was consecrated by Thilo of Trotha, the Bishop of Merseburg, on 10 April 1496. During the Reformation it was converted to Lutheranism. The reformer Martin Luther preached here on Pentecost Sunday in 1539. The collegiate buildings were demolished in 1541 following the college's dissolution.

The current church tower was first built in 1537 and rebuilt in 1702. Chapels added in the 17th century and an ante-building along the northern front of the nave with two stairways were removed at the end of the 19th century.

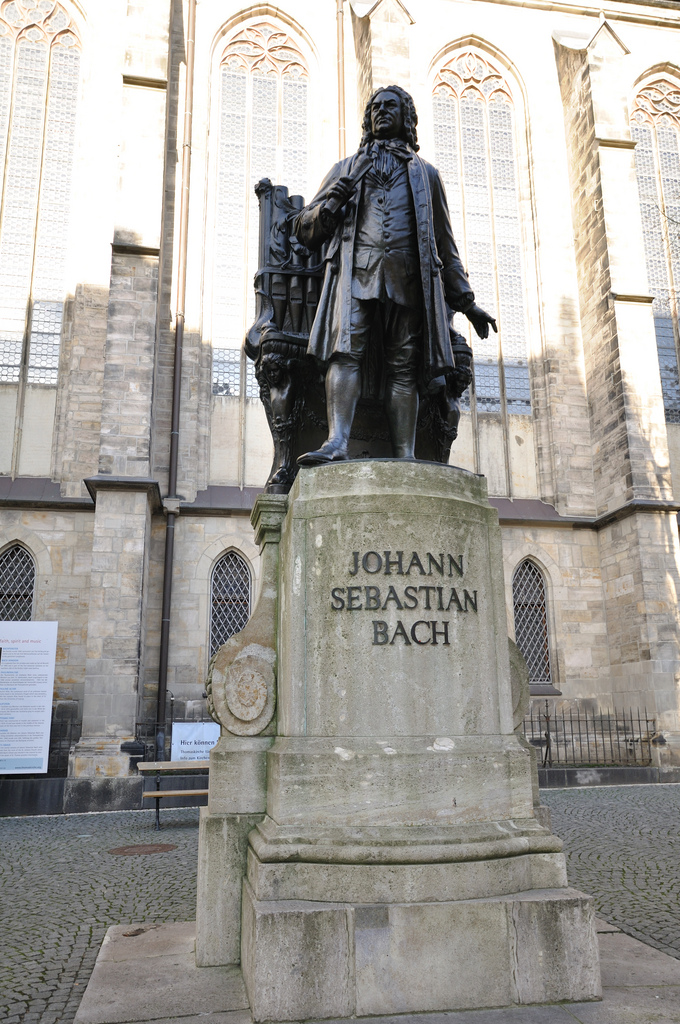
Statue of Johann Sebastian Bach at the Thomaskirche

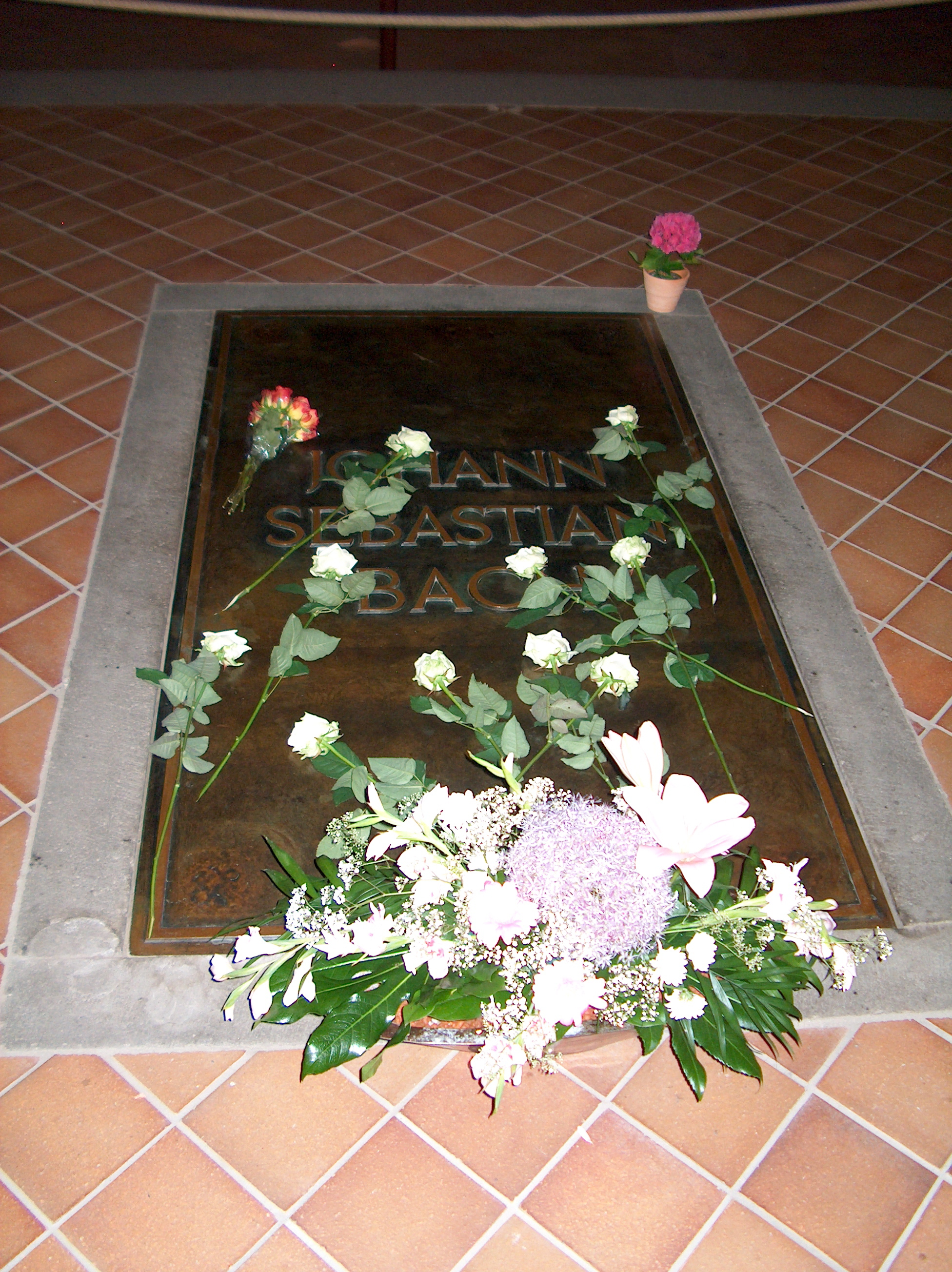
Bach's grave beneath the floor of the choir (sanctuary) of the church

The composer Johann Sebastian Bach was Thomaskantor, director of music, from 1723 until his death in 1750 and taught at its affiliated school. A statue of Bach by the Leipzig sculptor Carl Seffner that stands next to the church was dedicated in 1908.

Wolfgang Amadeus Mozart played the church organ on one of his European tours in 1789. In 1806, the church served as a munitions depot for the French army. During the Battle of Leipzig in 1813, it was used as a military hospital.

Richard Wagner was baptized here on 16 August 1813. In 1828, he studied piano and counterpoint with the then Thomaskantor, Christian Th. Weinlig.

Most of the Baroque internal trappings of the church known to Bach were removed in a Gothic Revival renovation between 1884 and 1889. The pulpit and the main portal in the west facade also date from this period.

During the Nazi era, the church office worked with government officials to identify which congregants were of Sinti-Romani heritage, ultimately leading to the death of certain parishioners at concentration camps.

On 4 December 1943, the tower was damaged in an Allied bombing raid on Leipzig, requiring repair. In 1949 the authorities demolished the St. John Church, also damaged by bombs in 1943, and in 1950 the remains of Johann Sebastian Bach were moved from there to the St. Thomas church.

In the 20th century, sulfur emitted from nearby coal mines, and other pollutants in the atmosphere caused the deterioration of exterior stonework and statuary, and even of interior Gothic paintings. In addition, the roof structure suffered from damage due to insects and moisture. For these reasons, the church was listed in the 2000 World Monuments Watch by the World Monuments Fund. Repairs were swiftly undertaken with financial support from the Fund and from American Express.

Repairs on the church from 1961 to 1964 also attempted to emphasize the Gothic hall church character of the building. Another renovation followed in 1991.

From 1993 to 2014, a 15th-century Gothic altar (originally in the St. Paul Church, the church of the University of Leipzig, destroyed in 1968 by the Communist authorities) was located in the St. Thomas Church. It was moved to the new St. Paul Church in 2014 and replaced in 2016 with a Gothic-revival altar by Constantin Lipsius made in 1888, which had been removed in 1964.

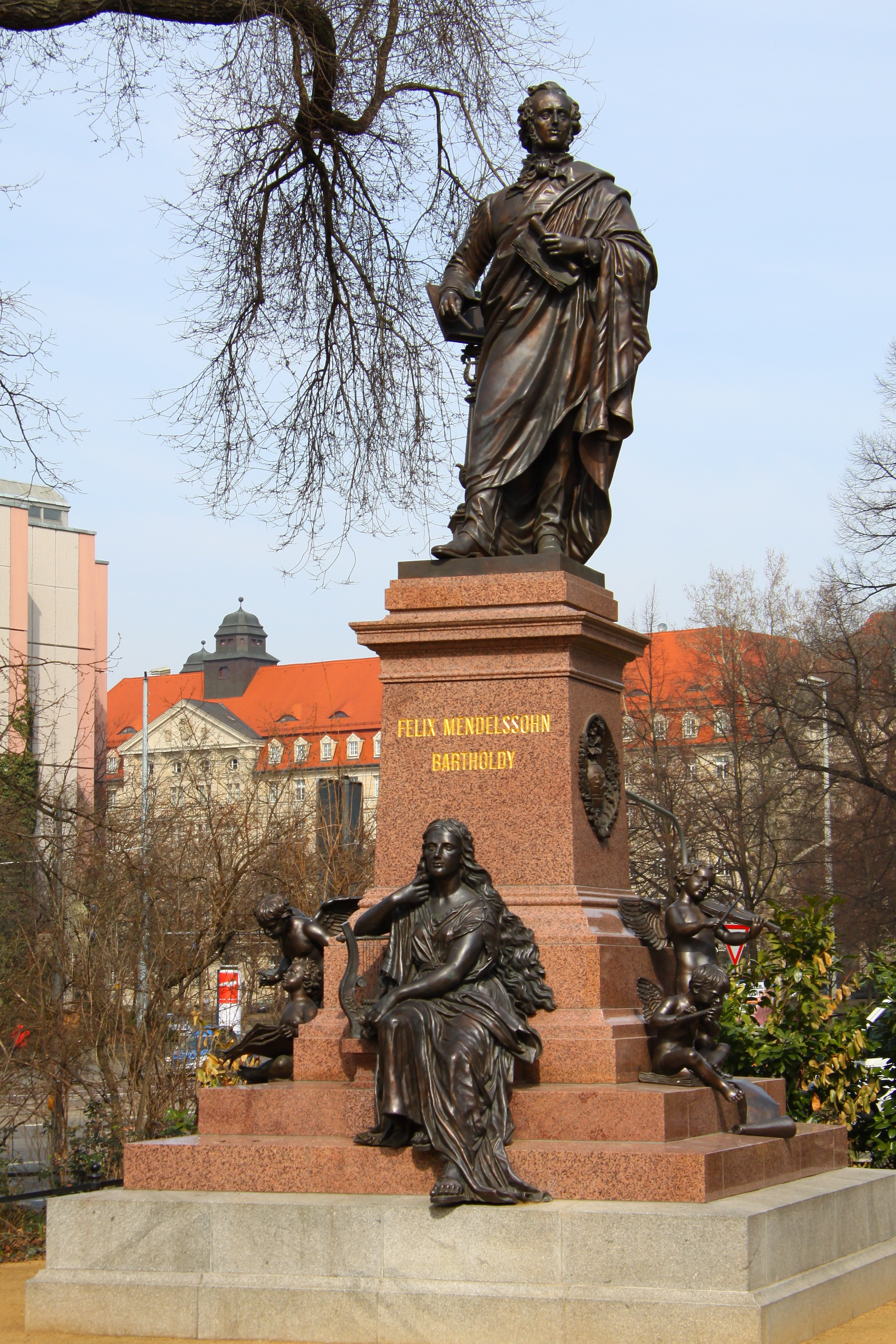
Mendelssohn statue

A statue of Felix Mendelssohn Bartholdy, who lived in Leipzig from 1835 until his death in 1847, was dedicated on 18 October 2008, when it was re-erected opposite the St. Thomas Church on the occasion of the year of his 200th birthday. The 6-meter (20 ft) statue depicts the former Gewandhaus Orchestra director and composer in bronze. Celebratory speeches were given by Kurt Masur, also a former Gewandhaus Orchestra director, and Burkhard Jung, mayor of Leipzig. The original statue designed by Werner Stein was first dedicated on 26 May 1892. It had been located on the east side of the Gewandhaus until 9 November 1936, when it was taken down by the Nazis because of the composer's Jewish background.

== Description ==
The church measures 76 meters (249 ft) in length, of which the nave accounts for 50 meters (160 ft). The nave is 25 meters (82 ft) wide and its walls reach a maximum height of 18 meters (59 ft). The church's roof is unusually steep, with a roof pitch of 63 degrees. It rises to a crown that is 45 meters (148 ft) high. The tower is 68 meters (223 ft) in height.

=== Works of art ===
The church features a number of works of art, including a baptismal font (1614–1615) made by Franz Döteber and Portraits show the Stadtsuperintendent of Leipzig, the oldest dating from 1614. A crucifix made by Caspar Friedrich Löbelt is one of the few remaining pieces from the times of Bach. The church also contains a number of notable epitaphs, such as the one for the knight Harras (d. 1451) and for councilor Daniel Leicher (1612). The colored windows in the choir were added after 1889. They show a number of historic motifs: a memorial to the fallen of World War I, King Gustavus Adolphus of Sweden, Johann Sebastian Bach, Martin Luther with Elector Friedrich der Weise and Philip Melanchthon as well as Emperor Wilhelm I.

=== Tomb of Johann Sebastian Bach ===
The remains of Johann Sebastian Bach have been buried in the Thomaskirche since 1950. After his death on 28 July 1750, Bach was laid to rest in the hospital cemetery of the Johanniskirche in Leipzig. With the start of the Bach renaissance in the 19th century, the public started to become interested in his remains and their whereabouts. In 1894, the anatomy professor Wilhelm His was commissioned to identify the composer's remains amongst disinterred bones from the cemetery where Bach had been buried. He concluded that "the assumption that the bones of an elderly man, which had been found in an oak coffin near the Johanneskirche, were the remains of Johann Sebastian Bach" (translated from German) was very likely. On 16 July 1900, the bones were placed into a stone sarcophagus underneath the Johanniskirche.

During the bombardment of Leipzig on 4 December 1943 the Johanniskirche burned down. The bones from Bach and Christian Fürchtegott Gellert were found without damages in 1949 in the crypt of the ruin. The bone from Bach was transferred to the Thomaskirche. The new grave with a bronze cover (sponsored by the Leipzig cultural officer of the Soviet Army) was inaugurated on 28 July 1950, two hundred years after the death of the composer, who is now buried in the sanctuary of the Thomaskirche.

=== Organs ===
==== Sauer-organ (since 1889) ====
Another notable feature of the Thomaskirche is that it contains two pipe organs. The older one is a Romantic organ by Wilhelm Sauer, built from 1884 to 1889 with three manuals, 63 stops and mechanical key and pneumatic stop action. Thomasorganist Carl Piutti ordered in 1902 two new stops and a higher wind pressure from Sauer. To 1908 Sauer rebuilt and enlarged the organ after instructions from Karl Straube, it contains now pneumatic key action and 88 stops. Between 1934 and 1940, in the working time from Günther Ramin, 16 romantic stops were changed against neo-baroque stops. The German organ builder Christian Scheffler reconstructed and repaired the Sauer-organ in two phases: 1988 to 1993 and in the years to 2005. He restored the organ in the situation in 1908.

==== Alexander-Schuke-organ (1967 to 1999) ====
Since the Sauer-Organ was considered unsuitable for Bach's music, a second organ with three manuals, 47 stops, a neo-baroque stoplist and mechanical key and stop action was built in 1966–1967 (by the Schuke company later named Alexander Schuke Potsdam Orgelbau). It was dismantled in May 1999 for the new Woehl-Organ. 42 stops and other parts from the Schuke-organ in St. Thomas was reused in the 68 stop-Schuke-organ, built in 2000 to 2005 in Fürstenwalde Cathedral.

==== Woehl-organ (since 2000) ====
The Schuke-organ was later replaced by a new organ, built by Gerald Woehl's organ-building company from 1999 to 2000. This "Bach organ" was designed to look similar to the Johann-Scheibe-organ, on which Bach had played in the Paulinerkirche, the stoplist is inspired by the Stertzing-organ, designed by Johann Christoph Bach in St. Georg's Church in Eisenach during J. S. Bach's childhood.

=== Church bells ===
The two bell chambers of the tower hold eight bells with a total weight of 10.8 metric tons (11.9 short tons). The largest and most precious bell is the Gloriosa, made in 1477 by Theodericus Reinhard; it is rung only on solemnities. Their weight is 5.2 metric tons (5.7 short tons), the tone an a^{0}. Its famous incised drawings were created by Nikolaus Eisenberg. The second bell, Mittelglocke (midbell), was cast in 1574 by Wolf Hilliger, and the so-called Mönchs- oder Beichtglocke (monk's or confessional bell) founded in 1634 by Jakob König, which also strikes the hours. The smallest of the historical bells is the Gebetsglocke (prayer's bell), a work by the master Christophorus Gros from 1585. A clock bell in the lantern of the tower strikes the quarters. In 2020/21 the aforementioned bells were refurbished. Also four new bells were created in the Bachert bell foundry with inscriptions that reflect words from the motets by Johann Sebastian Bach. On Reformation Day 2021, all eight bells rang out together for the first time.

== Choir ==
The Thomanerchor, the choir of the Thomaskirche, was founded in 1212 and is one of the oldest and most famous boys' choirs in Germany. It is headed by the Thomaskantor, an office that has been held by many well-known composers and musicians, including Johann Sebastian Bach from 1723 until his death in 1750.

== Gallery ==
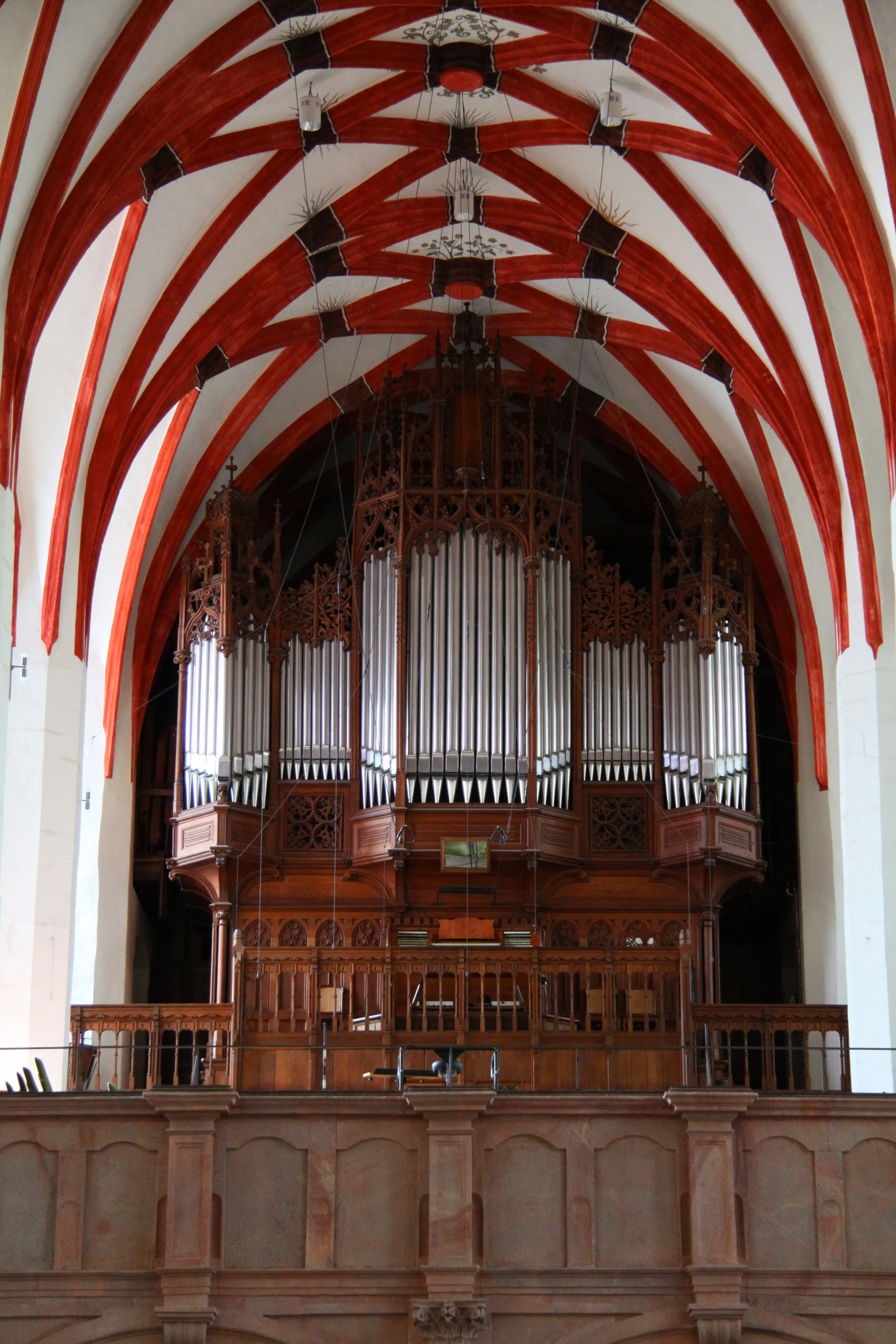
The Sauer organ

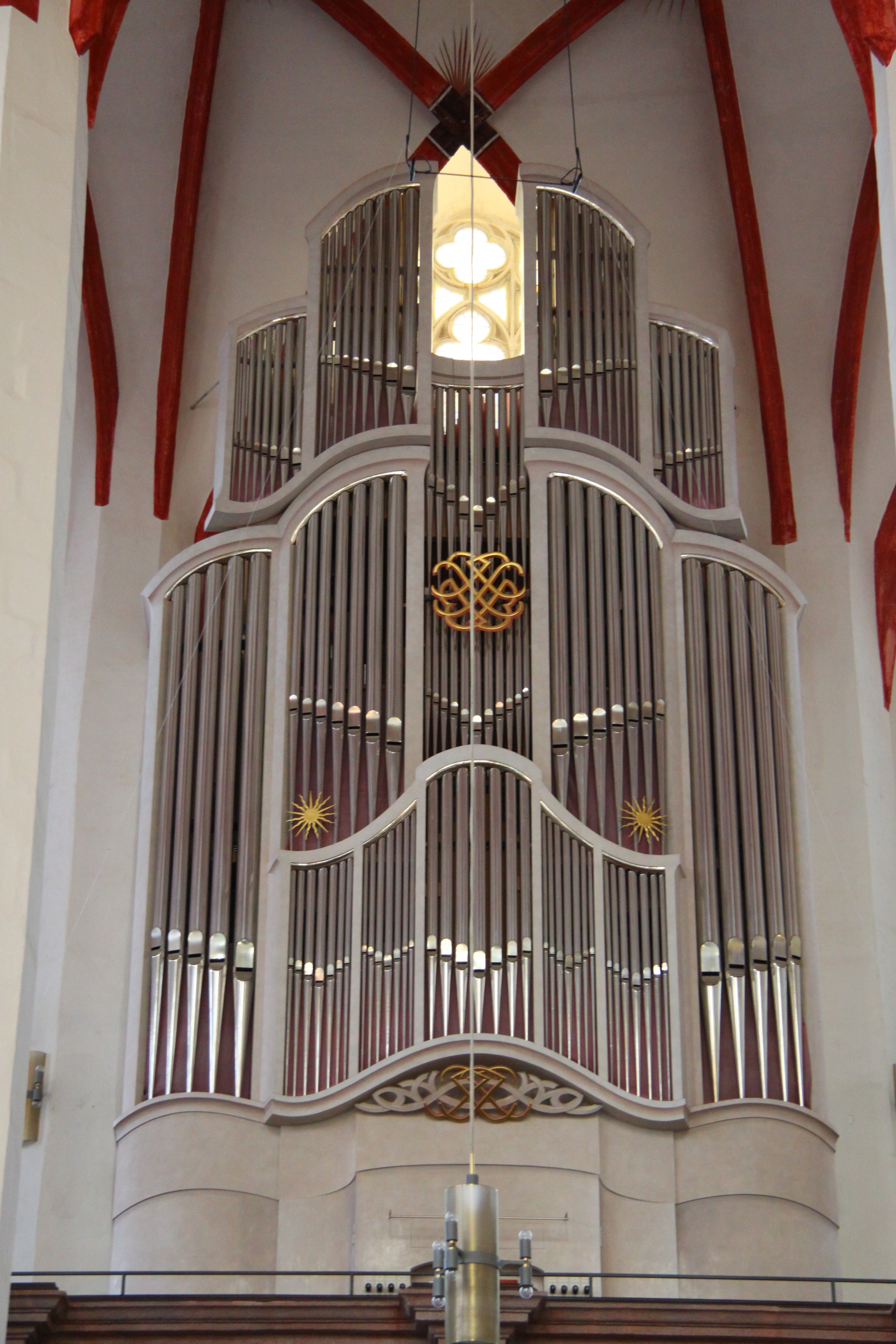
The Woehl organ

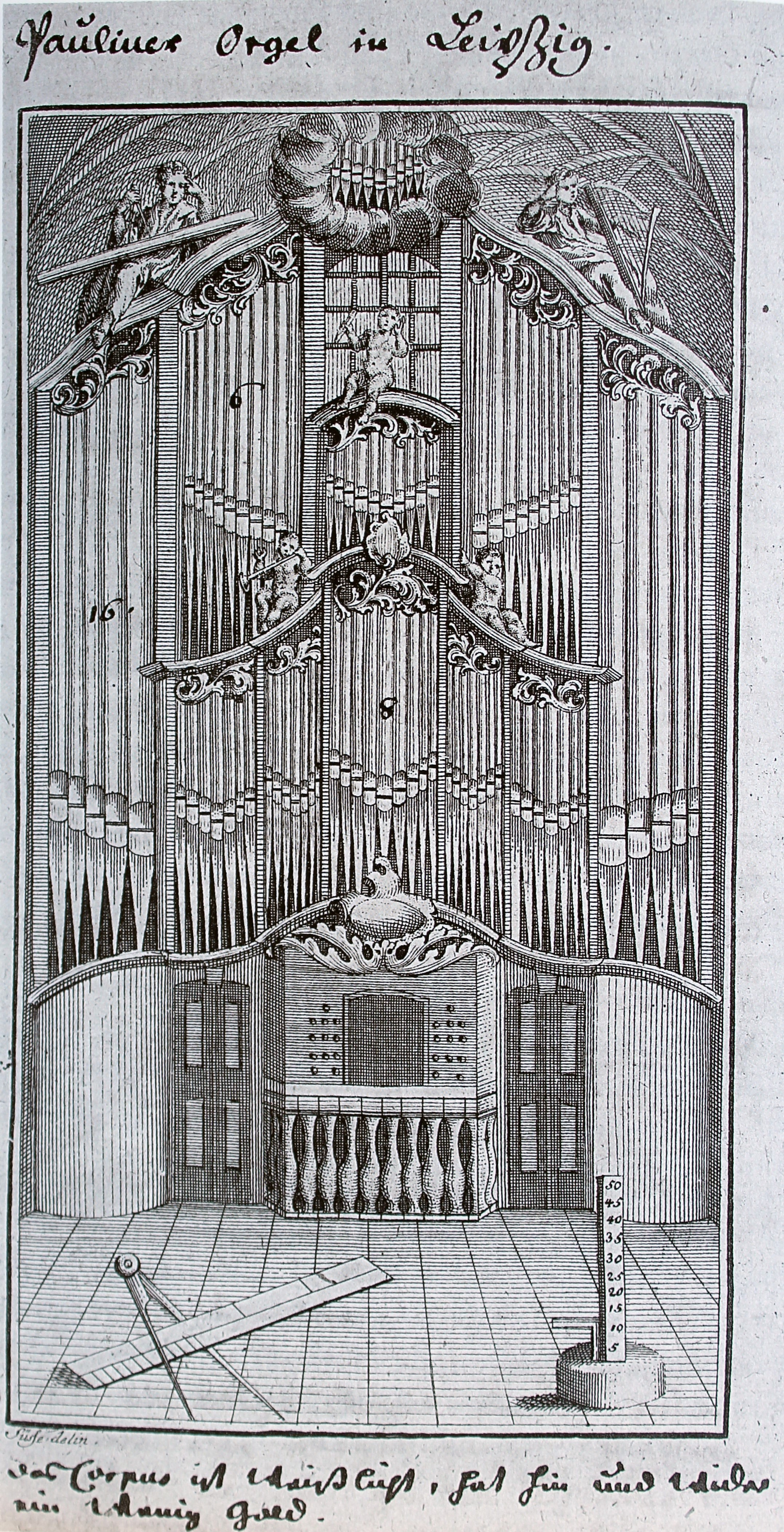
The Scheibe-organ from 1717 in Pauliner-/University-Church, certificated by Bach, was the inspiration for Woehl's organ case.

Exterior of Thomaskirche from north-east

(video) Exterior of Church with people, 2014

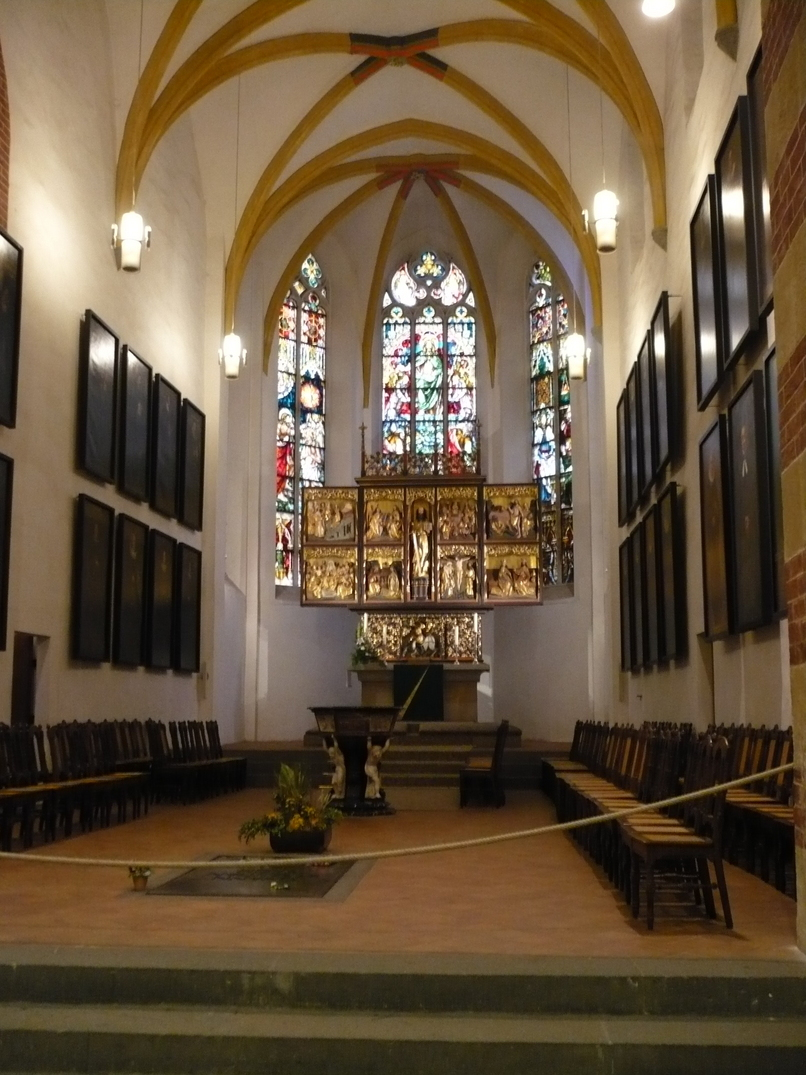
Altar and Bach's tomb

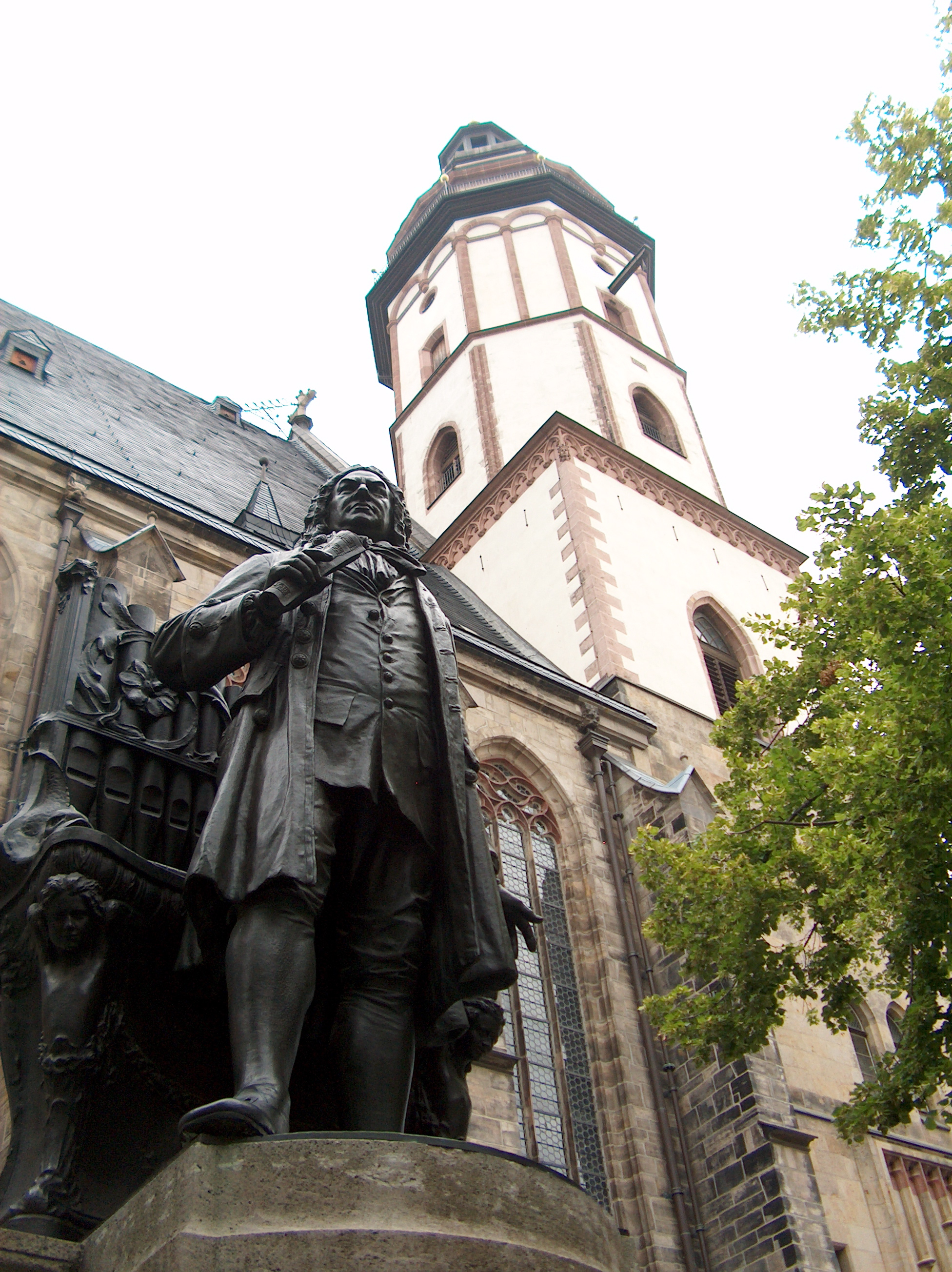
Exterior with Bach monument

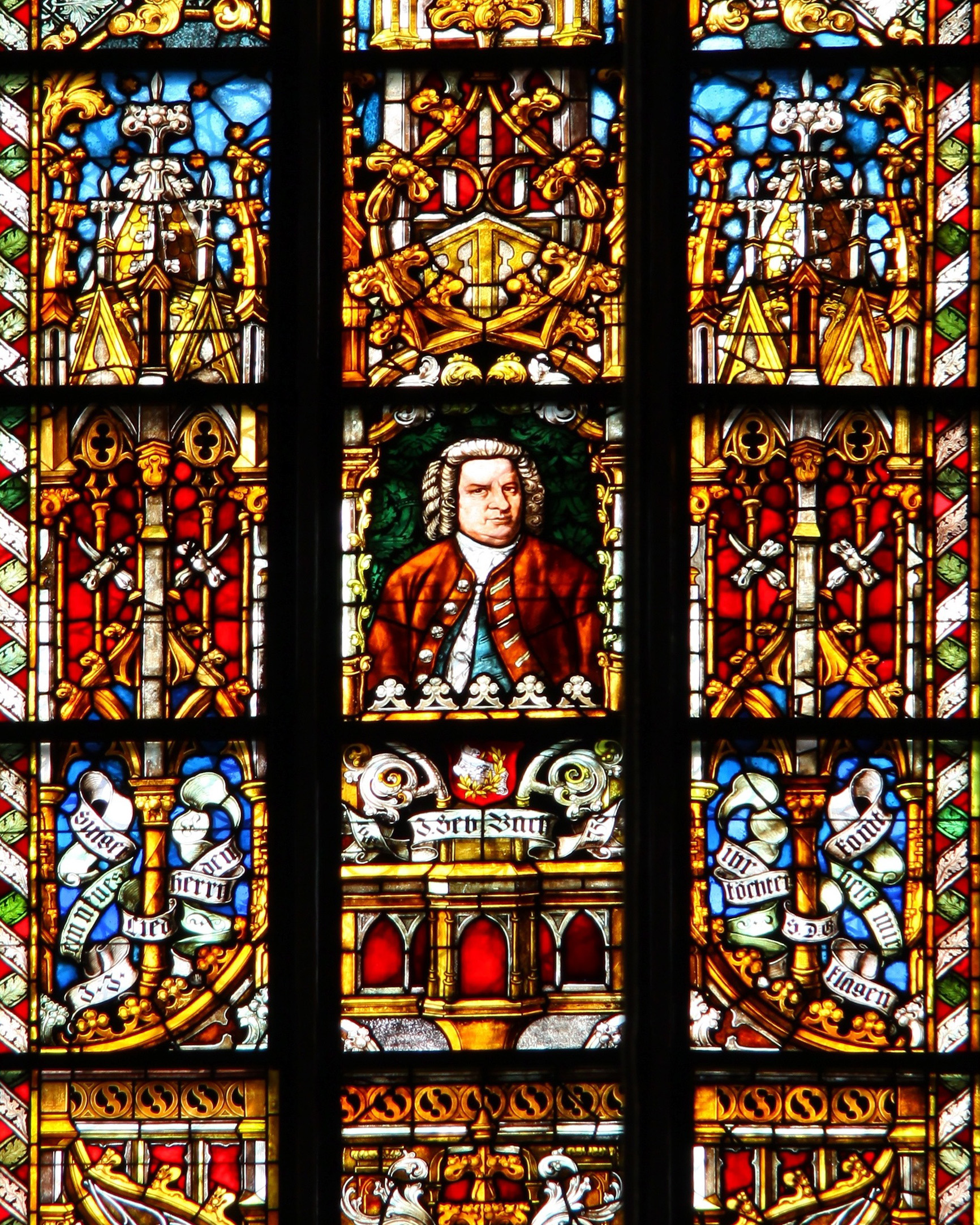
Stained-glass Bach church window (detail)

Interior of Thomaskirche, view to west

== See also ==
- Architecture of Leipzig - Romanesque and Gothic
- St. Thomas Church Square
