= Elsa Asenijeff =

Austrian writer and model (1867–1941)

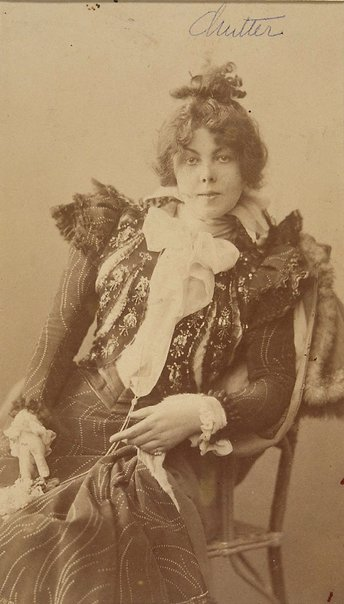
- Born: 3 January 1867 Vienna
- Died: 5 April 1941 (aged 74)

Signature
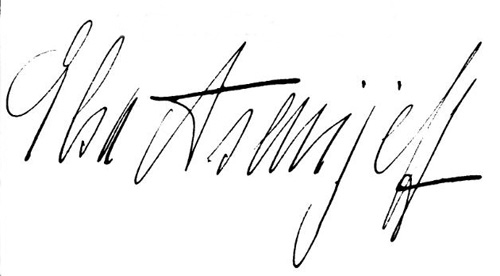

Elsa Asenijeff (Elsa Maria Packeny 3 January 1867 in Vienna, Austria-Hungary – 5 April 1941 in Braunsdorf) was an Austrian writer and partner of Max Klinger.

== Life ==
Elsa Maria Packeny came from the Viennese bourgeoisie. Her father (Karl Packeny) was director of the Austrian Southern Railway. Until 1887 she attended the Vienna Teacher Training Center.

After she had refused several marriage proposals, her parents forced her to marry. In 1890 she married the eleven-years-older Bulgarian engineer and diplomat Ivan Johann Nestoroff and went with him to Sofia, Bulgaria. The marriage was not happy. She felt at the mercy of her husband, a theme that influenced her literary works in many ways. In 1896 she wrote a narrative volume Is That Love? using the pseudonym Elsa Asenijeff, which she had chosen in memory of her deceased firstborn son Asen.

In 1896, she divorced Nestoroff and the Bulgarian state allowed her to use Asenijeff as her official name. In 1897 she went to Leipzig, Germany to study philosophy and economics. She left her second son Heraclitus, born in 1896, with her grandparents.

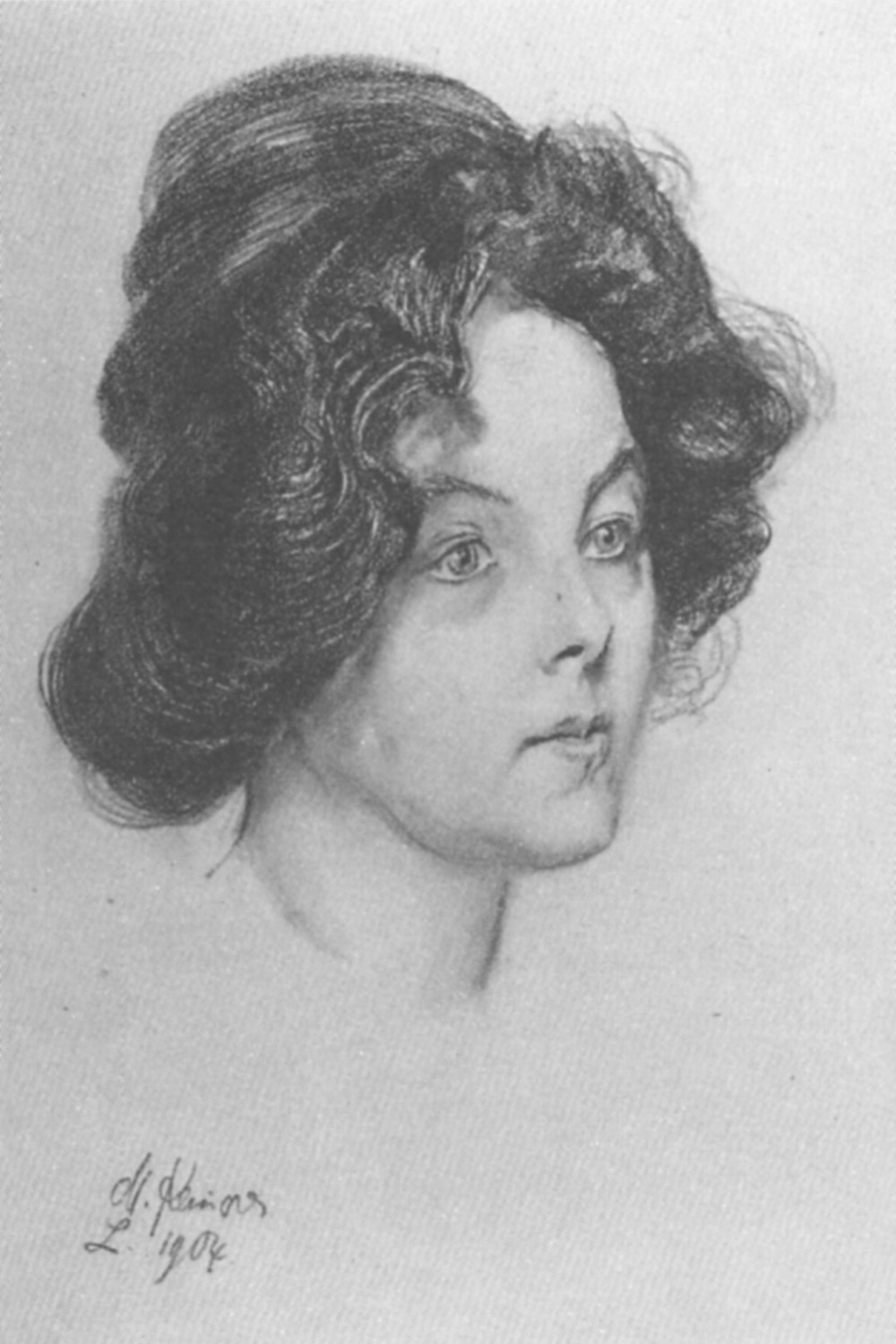
Elsa Asenijeff 1904, drawing by Max Klinger

At a Literary Society festival in Leipzig for Detlev von Liliencron (1844–1909) and Frank Wedekind (1864–1918), she met the painter and sculptor Max Klinger (1857–1920). She became a model, muse and lover for him, but Klinger did not make the relationship public. He paid for her expensive apartment in the prestigious Musikviertel neighbourhood (270 m^{2} (2,900 sq ft) in Schwägrichenstrasse 11, upper ground floor). She accompanied him on numerous trips and worked as a hostess at social events. She was considered an extremely impressive, fascinating, and sometimes even extravagant personality. Their daughter Désirée was born on 7 September 1900, during a longer stay in Paris and she was given to a French foster mother.

In 1903, Klinger purchased a vineyard in Großjena, including a winegrower's cottage, which he converted into a normal residential building in order to be able to withdraw from the hectic city life of Leipzig with Asenijeff. More books of hers appeared. From 1912 she also wrote poetry. Guests of their salon were, among others, the three young poets Walter Hasenclever (1890–1940), Kurt Pinthus (1886–1975) and Franz Werfel (1890–1945).

An alienation between Klinger and Asenijeff deepened further when Klinger in 1911 chose 18-year-old Gertrud Bock (1893–1932) as a model and constant companion, whom he married a few months before his death. In 1916, there was a final break between Asenijeff and Klinger.

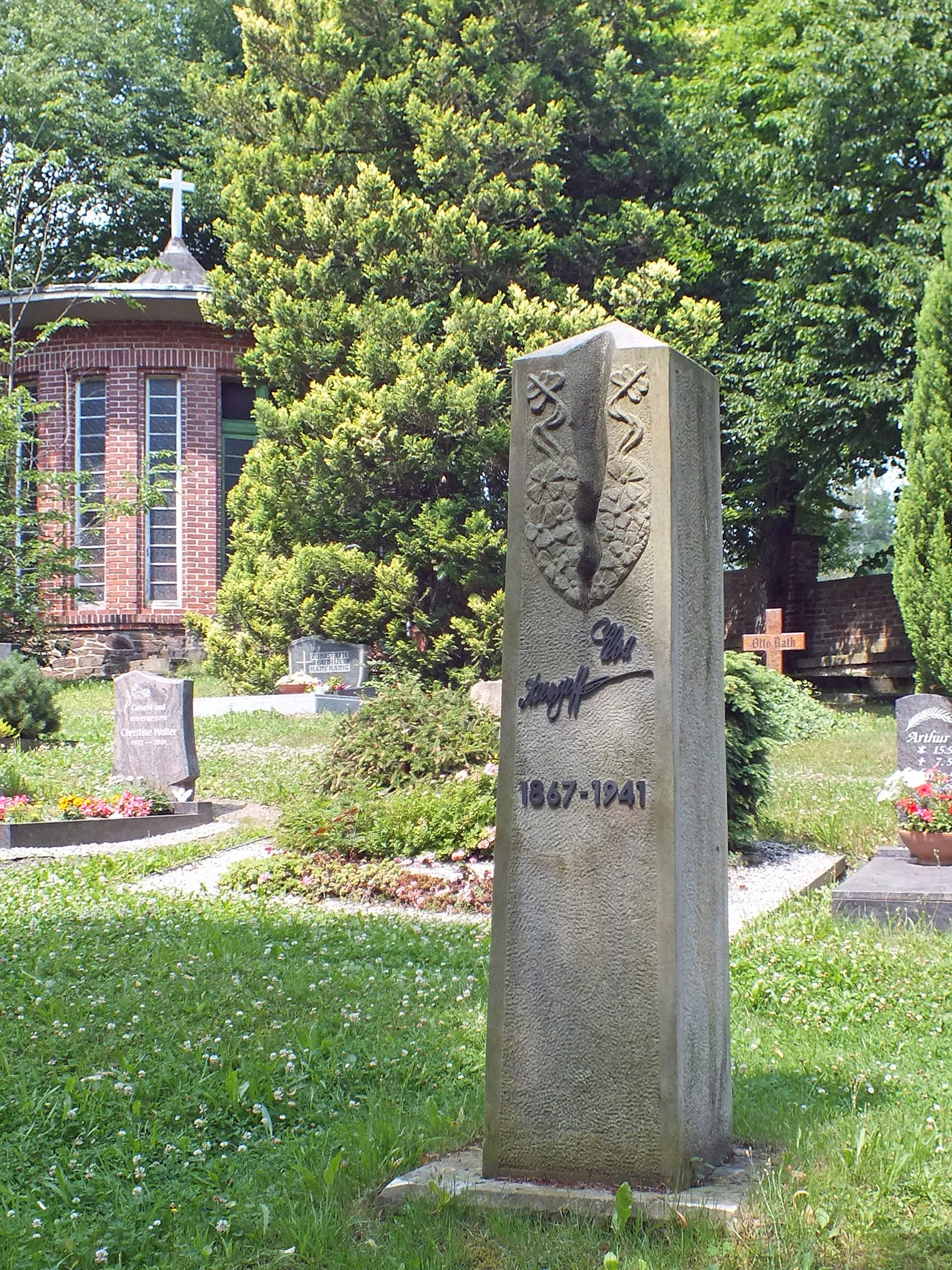
Memorial stone for Elsa Asenijeff in the cemetery in Bräunsdorf near Freiberg in Saxony.

This separation was mentally and materially very difficult because Klinger denied Asenijeff any further support. In 1917 she had to give up the apartment in the Dufourstraße 18, where she had moved in 1909. She lived only on a pension. She began a descent into poverty, associated with a certain decay of personality. Even a poetry book published in 1922 brought no improvement.

Elsa Asenijeff was completely isolated, had no connection to her Viennese relatives, and her daughter Désirée, who spent some time in Leipzig for the funeral of her father in 1920, did not make any contact with her. Lease debts eventually led to her admission to the Psychiatric Clinic of the University of Leipzig. She viewed her incapacitation as fraud and demanded compensation because she still saw herself as one of the greatest writers. A two-year stay in the Leipzig-Dösen hospital, followed in 1926 by the transfer to Hubertusburg and finally as “not a danger to the public” in the Colditz Castle. In 1933, the responsible authorities relocated this facility to Bräunsdorf near Freiberg as a “correctional institution for antisocial adults and those unwilling to work”. She died there on 5 April 1941.

== Selected works ==
- Ist das Liebe? Kleine psychologische Erzählungen und Betrachtungen. 2. Auflage. Friedrich, Leipzig 1896, (Reprint: Turmhut-Verlag, Mellrichstadt 2005, ISBN 3-936084-43-2)
- Sehnsucht, Wilhelm Friedrich Verlag, Leipzig, 1898. (digitalisiert)
- Aufruhr der Weiber und das Dritte Geschlecht.. Wilhelm Friedrich Verlag, Leipzig, 1898. (Online bei ALO). (Reprint: Austrian literature online, Band 7. Austrian literature online, Graz (u. a.) s. a., ISBN 3-226-00394-1).
- Sehnsucht.. Wilhelm Friedrich Verlag, Leipzig 1898. (Online bei ALO).
- Unschuld, Ein modernes Märchenbuch, Verlag Hermann Seemann Nachfolger, Leipzig, 1901. (digitalisiert)
- Tagebuchblätter einer Emancipierten.. Seemann, Leipzig 1902. (Online bei ALO). (Kommentierte Neuauflage: Turmhut-Verlag, Mellrichstadt 2006, ISBN 3-936084-61-0).
- Max Klingers Beethoven – eine kunst-technische Studie. Hermann Seemann Nachfolger, Leipzig 1902.
- Die Schwestern, eine Novelle, Magazin-Verlag Jacques Hegner, Berlin und Leipzig, 1905. (digitalisiert)
- Die neue Scheherazade. Ein Roman in Gefühlen.&zoom=3&viewmode=fullscreen Die neue Scheherazade. Ein Roman in Gefühlen.. Müller, München 1913. (Online bei ALO).
- Hohelied an den Ungenannten, Georg Müller Verlag, München, 1914 (Reprint Nabu Press, 2012, ISBN 978-1-274-60794-2). (digitalisiert)
- Aufschrei. Freie Rhythmen. A. H. Payne, Leipzig 1922.
- Bilanz der Moderne – Gedichte aus der Anstalt, (Hrsg. Rita Jorek), Turmhut-Verlag, Mellrichstadt 2010, ISBN 978-3-936084-82-5.
- Bo Osdrowski/Tom Riebe (Hrsg.): Elsa Asenijeff. Versensporn - Heft für lyrische Reize Nr. 19, Edition POESIE SCHMECKT GUT, Jena 2015, 120 Exemplare.

== Sources ==
- Rita Jorek: Aufschrei (Elsa Asenijeff). In: Friderun Bodeit (Hrsg.): Ich muß mich ganz hingeben können. Frauen in Leipzig. Verlag für die Frau, Leipzig 1990, ISBN 3-7304-0256-0, S. 175–190.
- Peter Nürnberg: Traumgekrönt. Elsa Asenijeff als Schriftstellerin. In: Leipziger Blätter Heft 17/1990. (Seemann), Leipzig 1990, ISSN 0232-7244, S. 40–43.
- Horst Riedel: Stadtlexikon Leipzig von A bis Z. PRO LEIPZIG, Leipzig 2005, ISBN 3-936508-03-8, S. 27.
- Rita Jorek: Asenijeff, Elsa (1867–1941). In: Britta Jürgs (Hrsg.): Denn da ist nichts mehr, wie es die Natur gewollt. Portraits von Künstlerinnen und Schriftstellerinnen um 1900. AvivA, Berlin (u. a.) 2001, ISBN 3-932338-13-8, S. 53–72.
- Annegret Friedrich: Max Klinger und Elsa Asenijeff. Geschlechterdifferenz als Programm. Dem Andenken an Ursula Baumgartl gewidmet. In: Femme fatale. Entwürfe. Frauen – Kunst – Wissenschaft, Band 19. S. n., Mannheim 1995, S. 31–41, OBV.
- Elsa Asenijeff. In: Christa Gürtler, Sigrid Schmid-Bortenschlager: Eigensinn und Widerstand. Schriftstellerinnen der Habsburgermonarchie. Ueberreuter, Wien 1998, ISBN 3-8000-3706-8, S. 201–212.
- Brigitte Spreitzer: Im Glanze seines Ruhmes … Elsa Asenijeff (1867–1941), im Zwielicht. In: Frauke Severit (Hrsg.): Das alles war ich. Politikerinnen, Künstlerinnen, Exzentrikerinnen der Wiener Moderne. Böhlau, Wien (u. a.) 1998, ISBN 3-205-98922-8, S. 163–201.
- Brigitte Spreitzer: ‚Kotzbrocken‘. Elsa Asenijeffs Behauptung weiblicher Denk-Eigenart wider das „große Wahngebäude“ der männlichen Wissenschaft. In: Brigitte Spreitzer: Texturen. Die österreichische Moderne der Frauen. Studien zur Moderne, Band 8, Passagen-Verlag, Wien 1999, ISBN 3-85165-365-3, S. 131–134. (Zugleich: Habilitationsschrift, Universität Graz, Graz 1998).
- Brigitte Spreitzer: „Nicht immer dies eine Ich sein“ … Die „kleine Kette ewiger Zersetzungsprozesse“ in den Anläufen weiblicher Selbstkonstitution bei Elsa Asenijeff. In: Spreitzer: Texturen. S. 70–78.
