= Arwed Roßbach =

German historicist architect

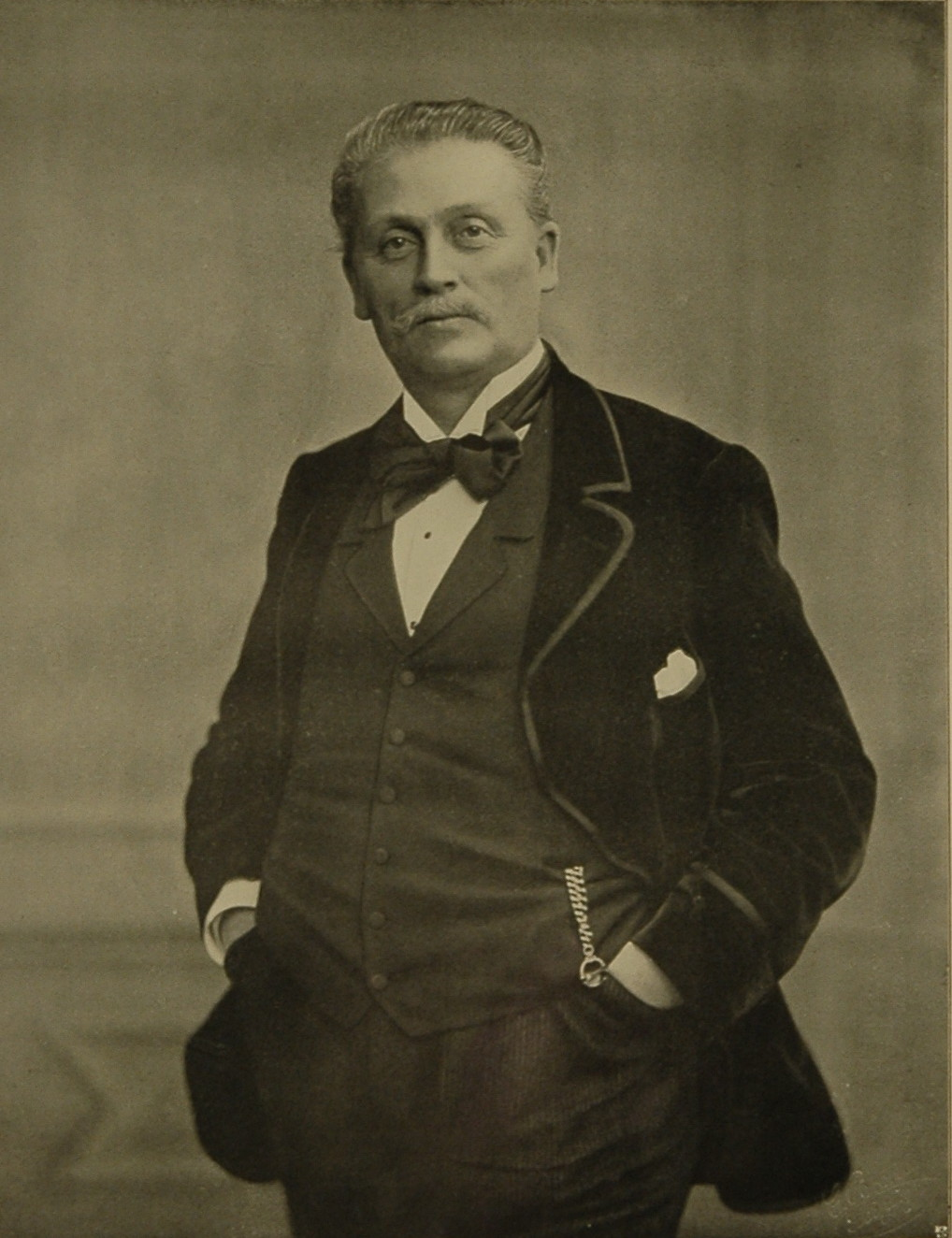

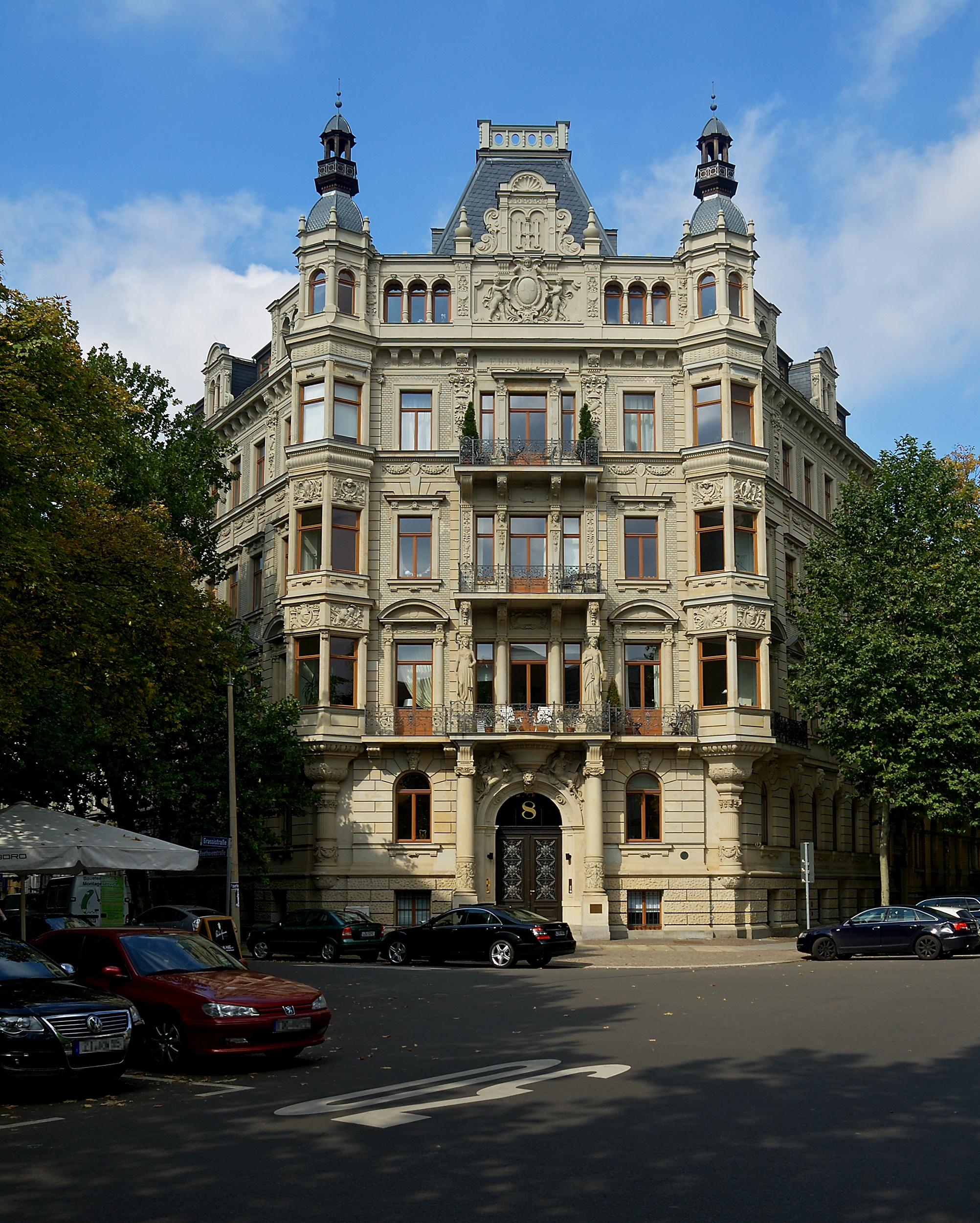
Dwelling house, called Roßbach-Haus, Musikviertel neighbourhood, Leipzig

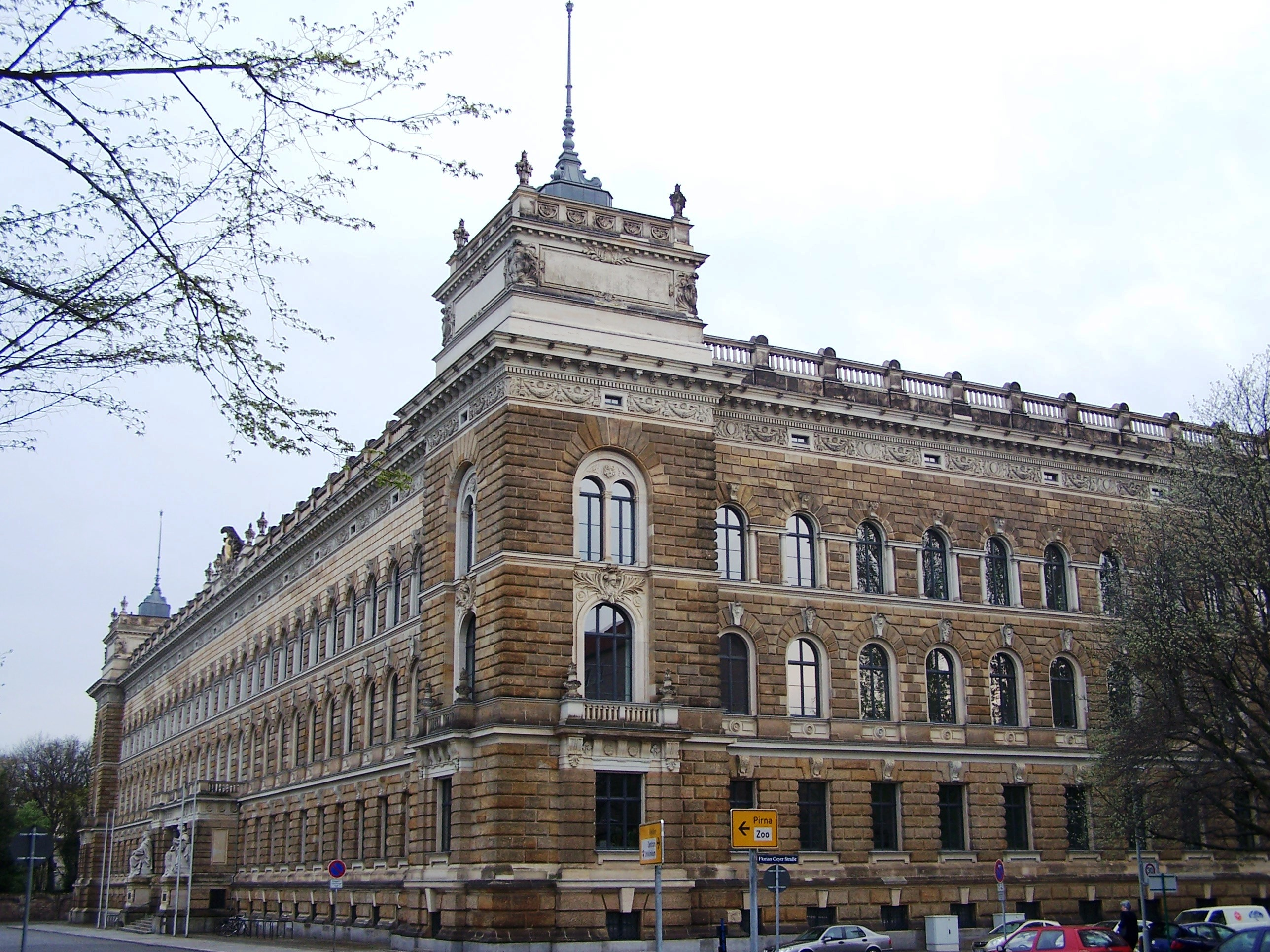
Landgericht (former Amtsgericht), Dresden

Max Arwed Roßbach (also spelled Rossbach, 24 November 1844 in Plauen – 31 December 1902 in Leipzig) was a German historicist architect in the late 19th century.

== Buildings ==
In Leipzig, he built a Gothic Revival styled facade for the Paulinerkirche in 1897. He designed a new building for the University of Leipzig, the so-called Rotes Kolleg in 1891/1892. In 1898/1901, he built the new building for the Deutsche Bank and later the Romanesque Revival styled Taborkirche, which was completed posthumously in 1904.

Roßbach built the municipal theater in his birthplace Plauen (1889/1899), the court building for the Amtsgericht in Dresden (1888/1892), and the Volkslesehalle (public library) in Jena (1898/1902).

== Literature ==
- Robert Bruck: Arwed Roßbach und seine Bauten. Berlin. 1904.
