= Musikviertel =

Neighbourhood of Leipzig, Germany

Coordinates: 51.331175°N 12.366056°E

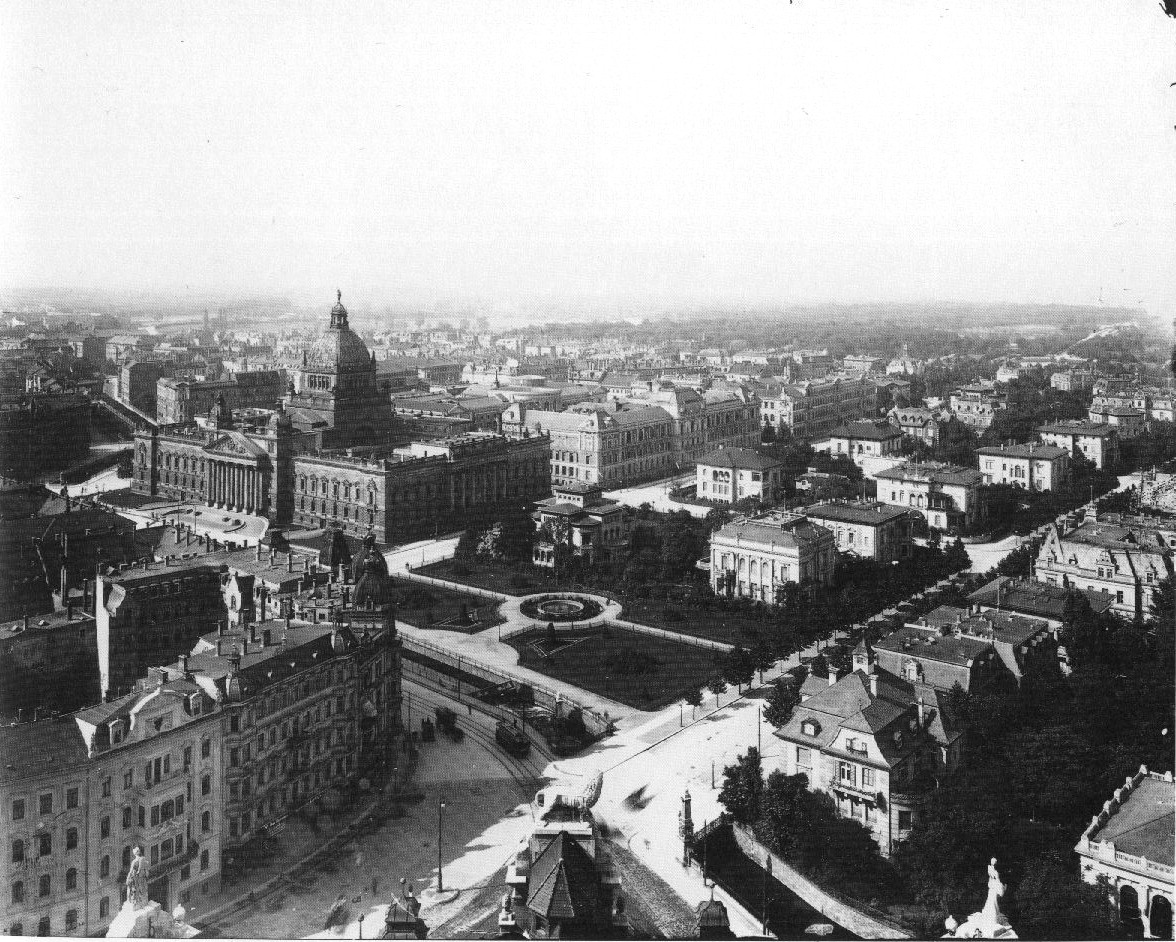
The Musikviertel in 1906 – View from the tower of the New Town Hall to the Imperial Court Building which housed the Reichsgericht

Musikviertel (English: Music quarter) is a neighbourhood in Leipzig, Germany. The Musikviertel is part of the locality Zentrum-Süd in the borough of Leipzig-Mitte.The name goes back to the first music institutions built in the neighbourhood, the second Gewandhaus (alias Neues Concerthaus) and the new building of the Royal Conservatory of Music. Several streets in the neighbourhood are named after composers, which is why the term musicians' quarter is used – incorrectly. Characteristic of the Musikviertel is the large number of buildings of historicism; numerous buildings are listed as Kulturdenkmal. Since 1991, an ensemble monument and preservation statute has been in force for the entire neighbourhood. It has an area of around 40 hectares (99 acres) and about 5,000 inhabitants.

== Location and location typology ==
The Musikviertel adjoins the city centre of Leipzig in a south-westerly direction. It is bordered to the east and southeast by the Pleißemühlgraben (English: Pleiße mill race), and to the southwest, west and north by the Karl-Tauchnitz-Strasse, which runs in an arc. To the west and north of the neighbourhood are the Clara-Zetkin-Park and the Johannapark; to the east is the Innere Südvorstadt (English: Inner southern vorstadt). According to the municipal structure of Leipzig, which has been in force since 1992, the Musikviertel is the western part of the Zentrum-Süd locality.

The northern part of the Musikviertel is characterised by representative public buildings: the Reich Court building, the University Library, the Hochschule für Grafik und Buchkunst Leipzig (Academy of Fine Arts Leipzig), the University of Music and Theatre Leipzig as well as a branch of the Leipzig University of Applied Sciences, the German Institute for Literature, the Humanities Centre of the Leipzig University and the Galerie für Zeitgenössische Kunst Leipzig (English: Gallery of Contemporary Art). The neighbourhood has many magnificent villas and bourgeois residences, which made the Musikviertel one of the most elegant neighbourhoods in the city. The gaps torn during the Second World War were partly filled with prefabricated buildings. After the fall of the Berlin Wall, a number of new villas, residential and office buildings were added from the mid-1990s onwards. Nevertheless, some gaps in the original building fabric have not been closed to this day. The Musikviertel is crossed by the Pleißemühlgraben, which has been partially restored since 1990 after being covered in the 1950s; a complete opening of the ditch is planned.

== History ==
=== Until 1880 ===
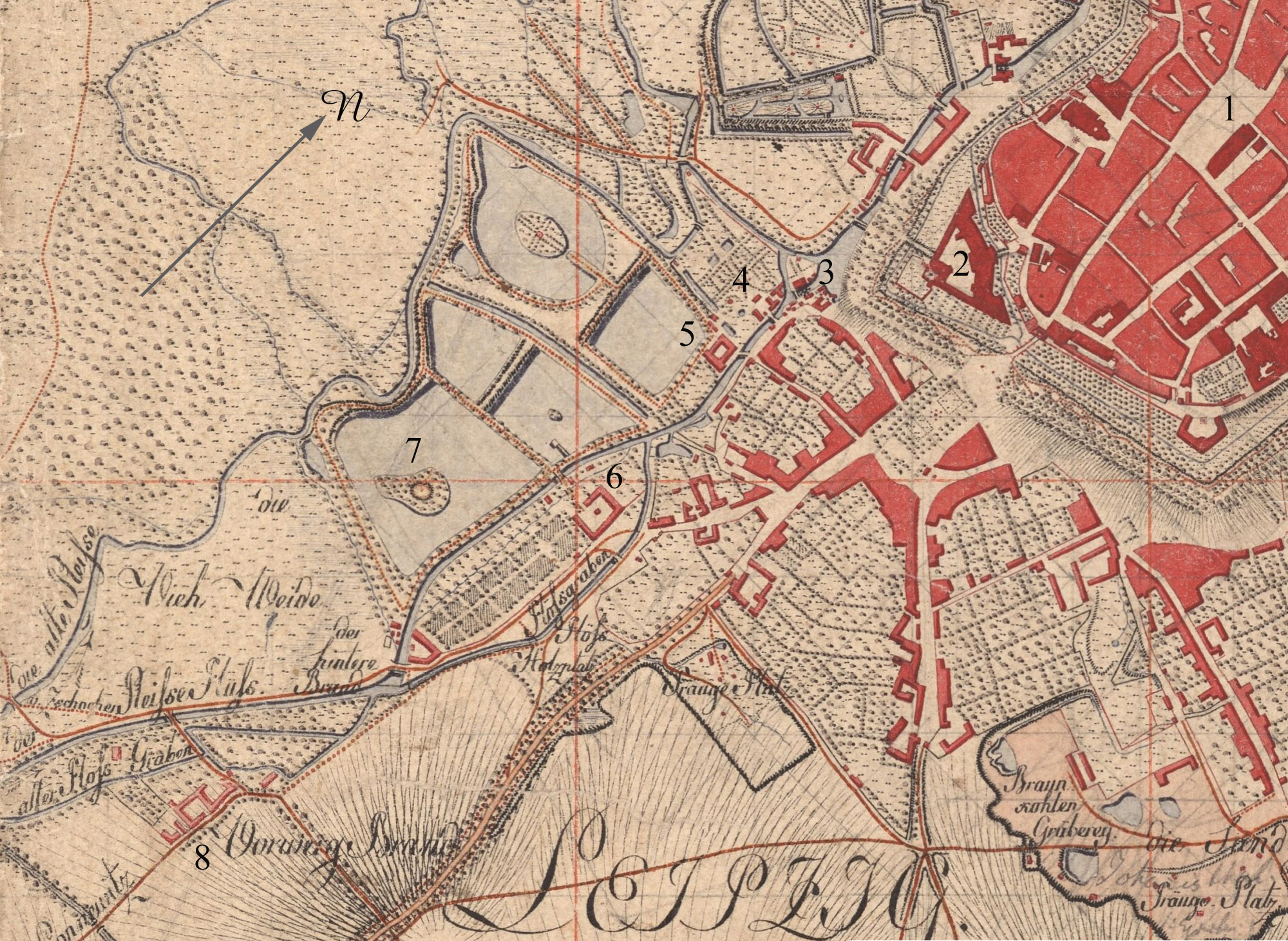
The area of the Musikviertel on a map around 1800

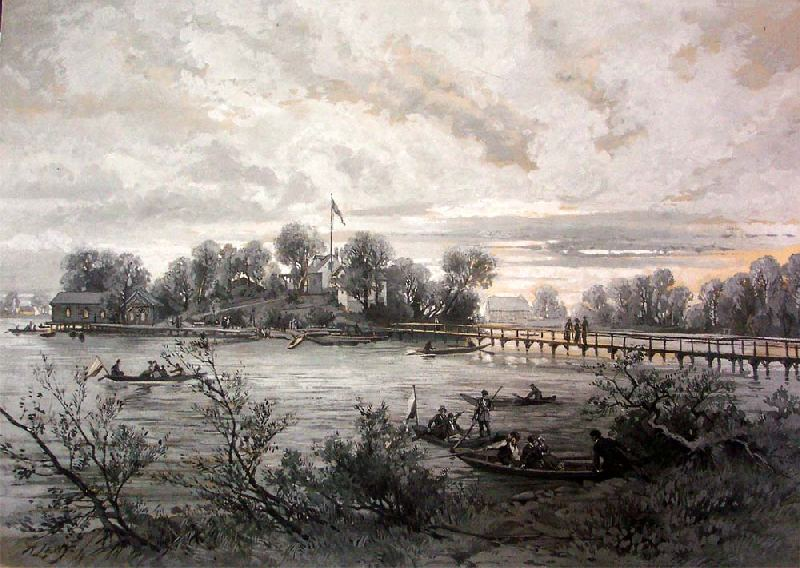
The island „Buen Retiro“

Until the first half of the 19th century, Leipzig's southwestern vorstadt area was a barely developed floodplain and garden landscape. Marshy meadows, ponds, alluvial forest and gardens characterised the terrain.

In the Middle Ages, the Cistercian nuns of the Georgenkloster had settled in the southwest in front of the city wall near the Pleissenburg (No. 2 on the map) until 1543 and built, among other things, a mill on the Pleißemühlgraben, the Nonnenmühle (No. 3), which existed until 1890. They also ran a brickyard, for which they used the clay of the floodplain. The remaining holes of the clay pits remained as ponds. At the beginning of the 19th century, there were gardens and ponds west of the Pleißemühlgraben, first Schwägrichen's Garden (No. 4) followed by the Trier Garden (No. 5) with two large ponds, which served the university as a botanical garden from 1806.

It was joined by the Schimmelsche Gut (No. 6), which bordered on the raft site, on which the timber rafted to Leipzig from the Vogtland and the Altenburger Land was stacked. The Schimmel estate had three ponds, the largest of which had an island. The farmer Johann Friedrich Schimmel had acquired the estate in 1823 and set up a restaurant on the island, which was very popular with the people of Leipzig, which could be reached via a wooden footbridge or by boat. He called the island (No. 7) "Buen Retiro" (Good Refuge).

In 1861, the Johannapark was completed on the former meadow site by Peter Joseph Lenné on behalf of Wilhelm Theodor Seyfferth. The efficiency of the railway made it possible to discontinue raft operations in 1864, so that the raft site could be transformed into a decorative place. A year later, the regulation of the Pleiße and Elster was started and new building land was gained by draining the area and backfilling the Alte Pleiße. In 1876, the botanical garden was relocated to today's Linnéstrasse.

=== 1880–1945 ===
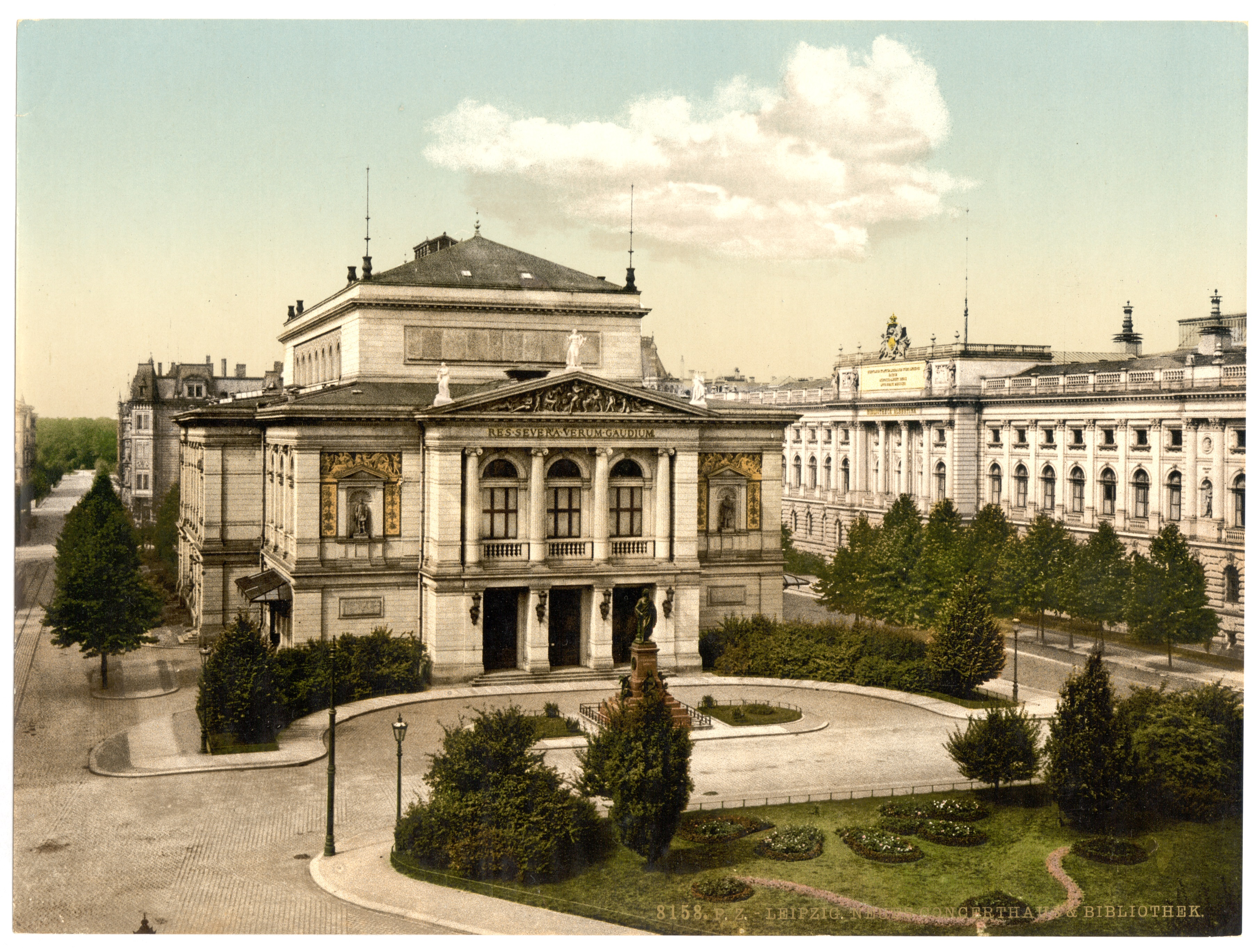
The second Gewandhaus (Neues Concerthaus) destroyed in the Second World War – on the right the university library Bibliotheca Albertina

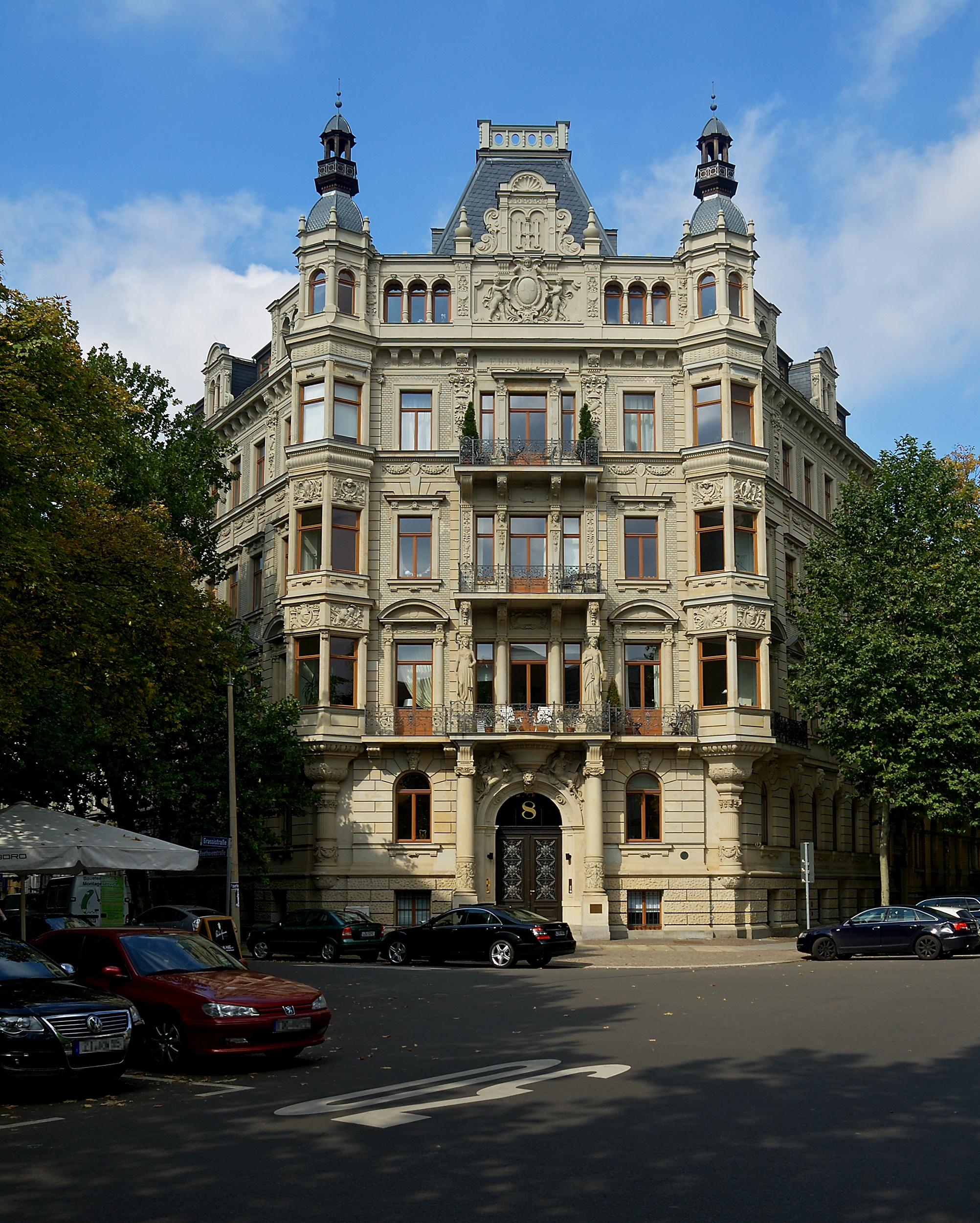
The Roßbach corner house, called Roßbach-Palais since 2004, by Arwed Roßbach, Beethovenstrasse 8 – built in 1892/93 (2010)

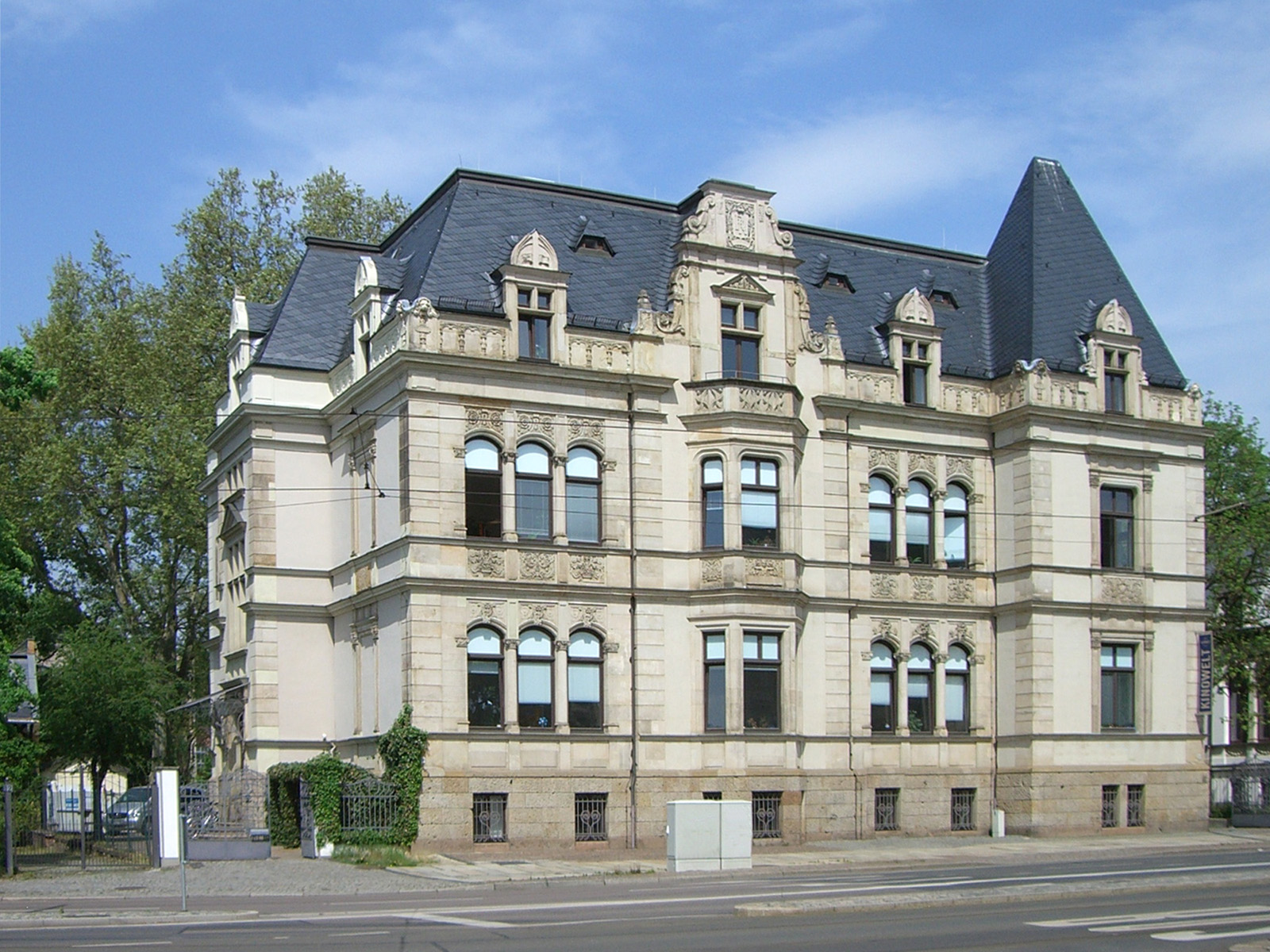
Villa Rentsch-Röder, Karl-Tauchnitz-Strasse 10 by Peter Dybwad – built in 1898 (2009)

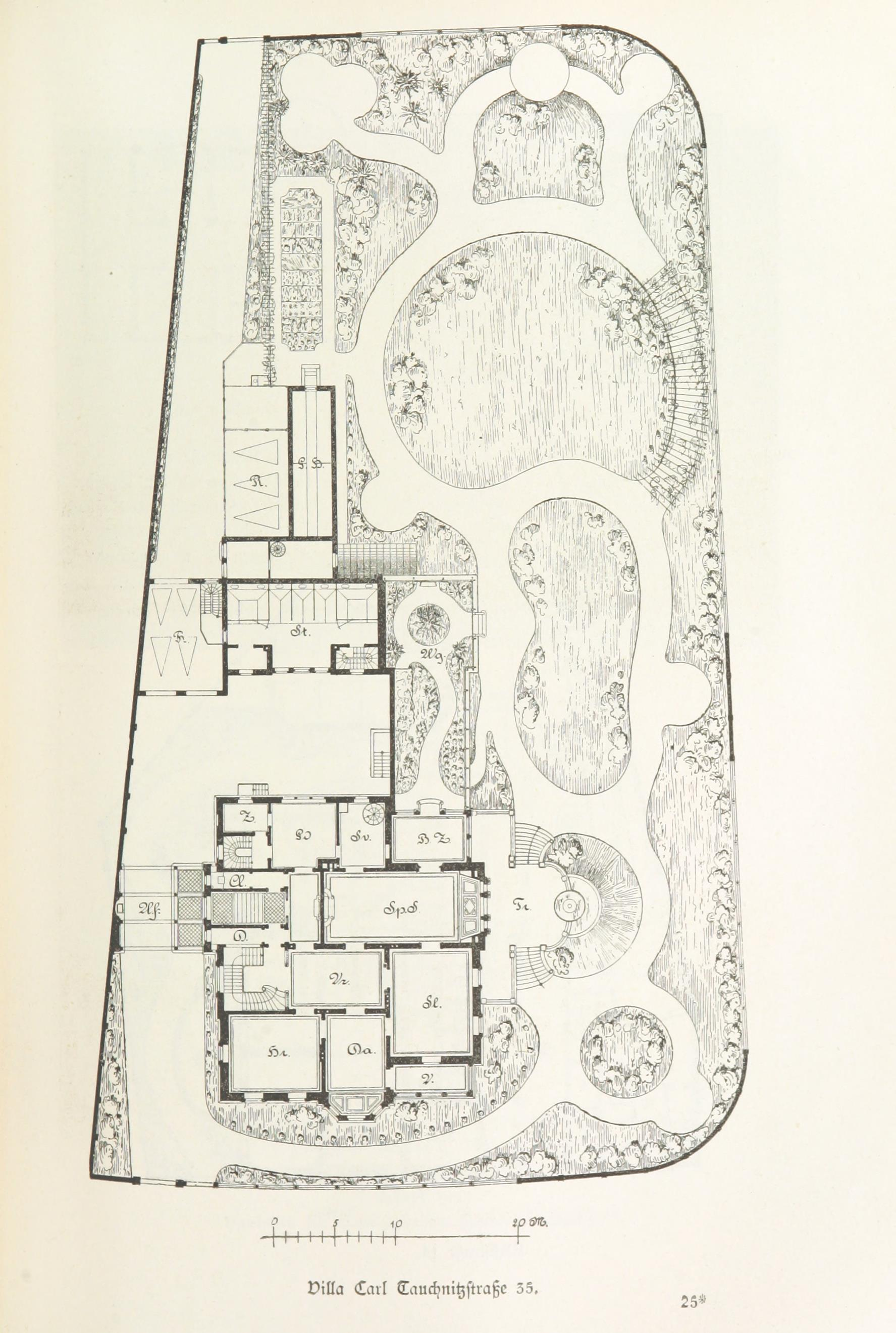
Floor plan of the Villa Gruner with gardens, Karl-Tauchnitz-Strasse 19 (before 1893)

In 1880, the city acquired, among other things, the area of the Schimmelsche Gut, and extensive land development and redesign began, including housing subdivision. The remaining holes of the drained ponds were filled in and the entire building site of the neighbourhood was leveled in an elaborate way, whereby the earth fills had immense dimensions. For flood protection, the ground level of the built-up terrain was raised by about 2 m (6.6 ft) compared to the meadows of the later King Albert Park. In 1882, the foundation stone was laid for the construction of the New Concert House, marking the beginning of the development of the Musikviertel. In 1884, this building – soon to be called the New Gewandhaus (second Gewandhaus) – was inaugurated. In 1887, the Royal Conservatory of Music was inaugurated. From 1888 to 1895, the Imperial Court building was built. In 1890 the Royal Academy of Graphic Arts and Book Trade was completed and in 1891 the university library Bibliotheca Albertina. In 1891, the new building of the Municipal Trade School (today part of the Leipzig University of Applied Sciences) was also handed over to its purpose, but its west wing was not completed until 1903. With the completion of the Imperial Court in 1895, the construction of the large public buildings in the Musikviertel was almost complete. From 1896, the electric tram ran through the Musikviertel. In 1897, the Saxon-Thuringian Industrial and Commercial Exhibition took place on the edge of the new neighbourhood.

From the mid-1880s, housing construction also began in the Musikviertel. Villas and multi-storey apartment buildings were built in closed and open building styles. Most of the buildings built first can be assigned to one of the so-called neo-styles of historicism (Renaissance Revival architecture or Baroque Revival architecture) in terms of architectural history. The stylistic model for the private builders was the large public buildings in the neighbourhood. An example of this is the striking Roßbach corner house (Beethovenstrasse 8) in the Renaissance Revival style, which was designed by the architect of the Bibliotheca Albertina and completed in 1893. After 1900, echoes of Art Nouveau can be found on some buildings, which can be seen in particular in the ornamentation and decoration of the façade design of some houses.

For the development of the area, there were detailed regulations such as building height, building distances, number of storeys and degree of development of the plots. The approval of the façade view was also reserved for the city council. Thus, with the Musikviertel, Leipzig received a particularly valuable area in terms of urban development, clearly structured by closed urban structures, which is now a listed ensemble as a cultural property ensemble.

The sides facing or close to the park were decorated with a ring of villas. The villa plots were quite generously sized and ranged from 1,200 to about 2,500 square metres (13,000 to about 27,000 sq ft), so that there was enough space for outbuildings (carriage houses), meter-high fenced front gardens and elaborately designed gardens. This was especially true of the villas on Karl-Tauchnitz-Strasse, of which a good third (13 of 32) are still preserved. Of the total of 71 villas in the district, 21 alone were designed by Max Pommer. He is followed by Peter Dybwad (10) and Arwed Roßbach (5).

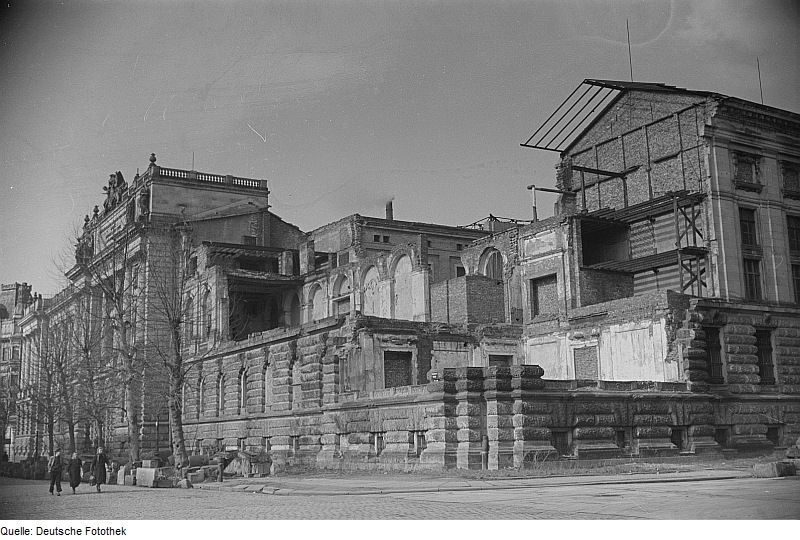
Partially destroyed Albertina University Library, photo by Roger Rössing (1953)

Around 1900, the development of the Musikviertel could in principle be considered complete. For decades, the new neighbourhood became the preferred address of Leipzig's Bildungsbürgertum. On 20 February 1944, an air raid was carried out on Leipzig and its southern district. In the Musikviertel, more than 50 percent of the buildings, including the Gewandhaus, the hall of the Conservatory, the Imperial Court, the University Library, many villas and residential buildings, were completely destroyed or severely damaged. Further attacks hit the Musikviertel on 27 February and 6 April 1945. In the latter, the central wing and the eastern part of the building of the Bibliotheca Albertina were destroyed.

War losses of historic buildings in the Musikviertel (examples)

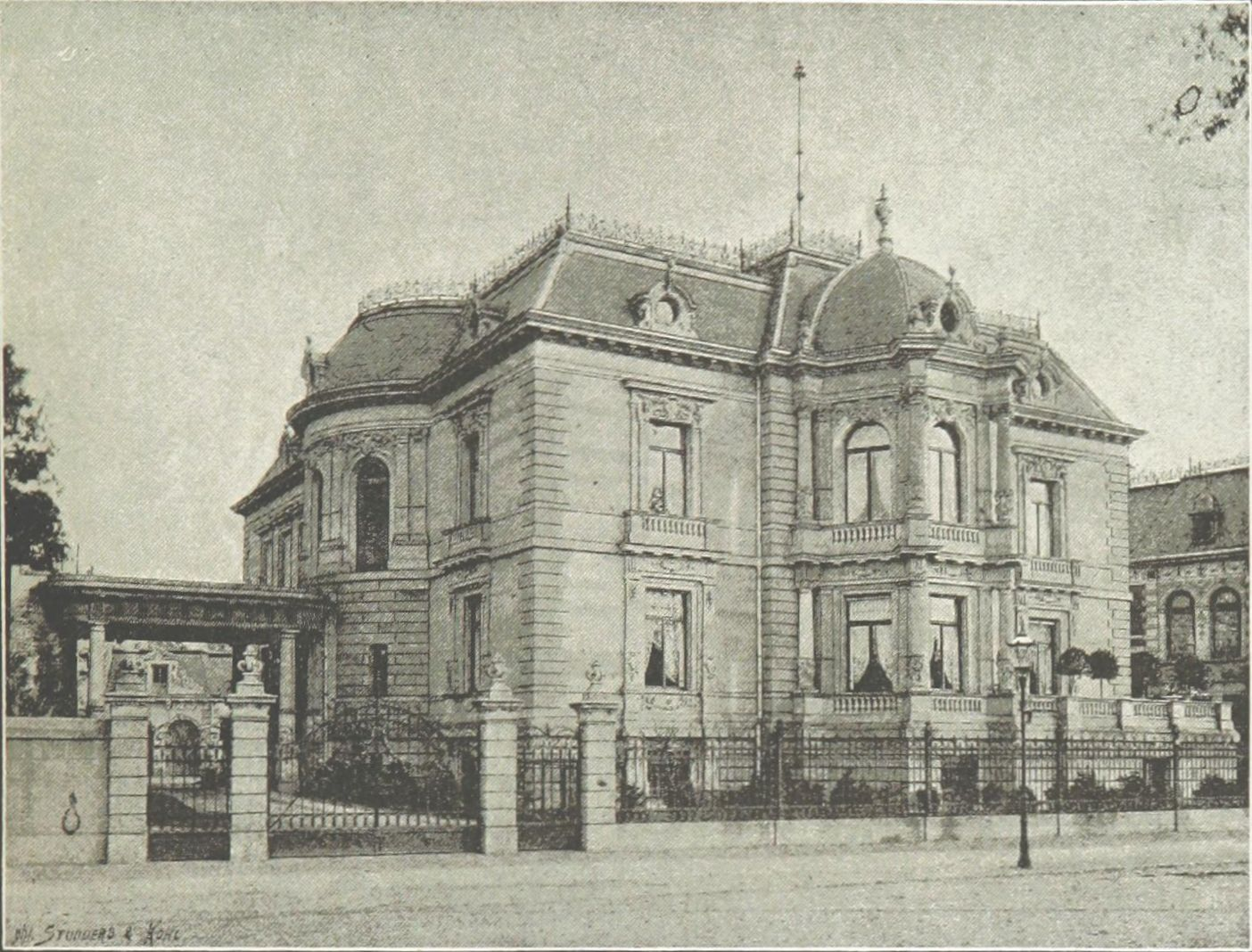
Villa Oelßner, Karl-Tauchnitz-Strasse 13 (1892)

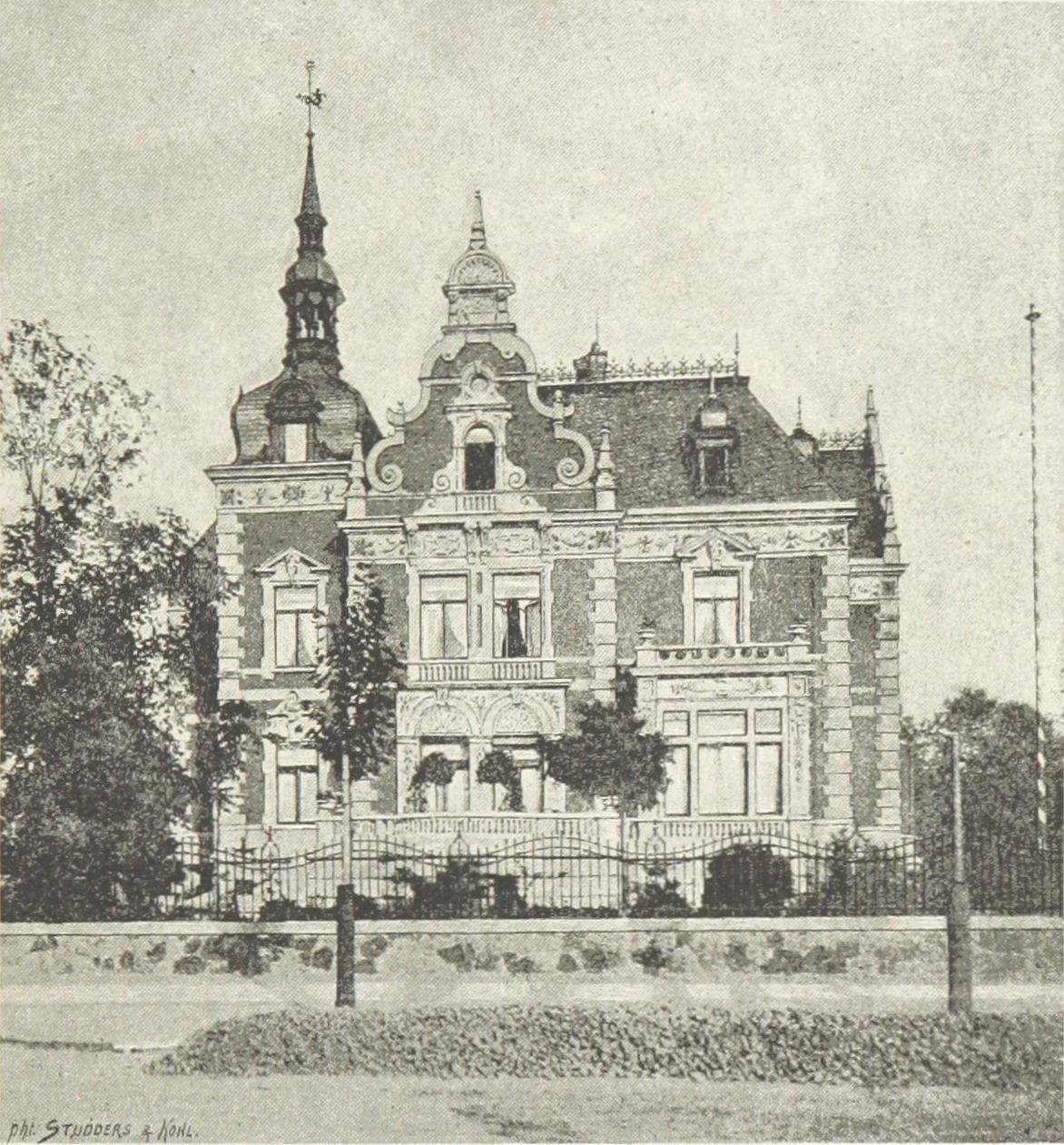
Villa Wölker, Karl-Tauchnitz-Strasse 15 (1892)

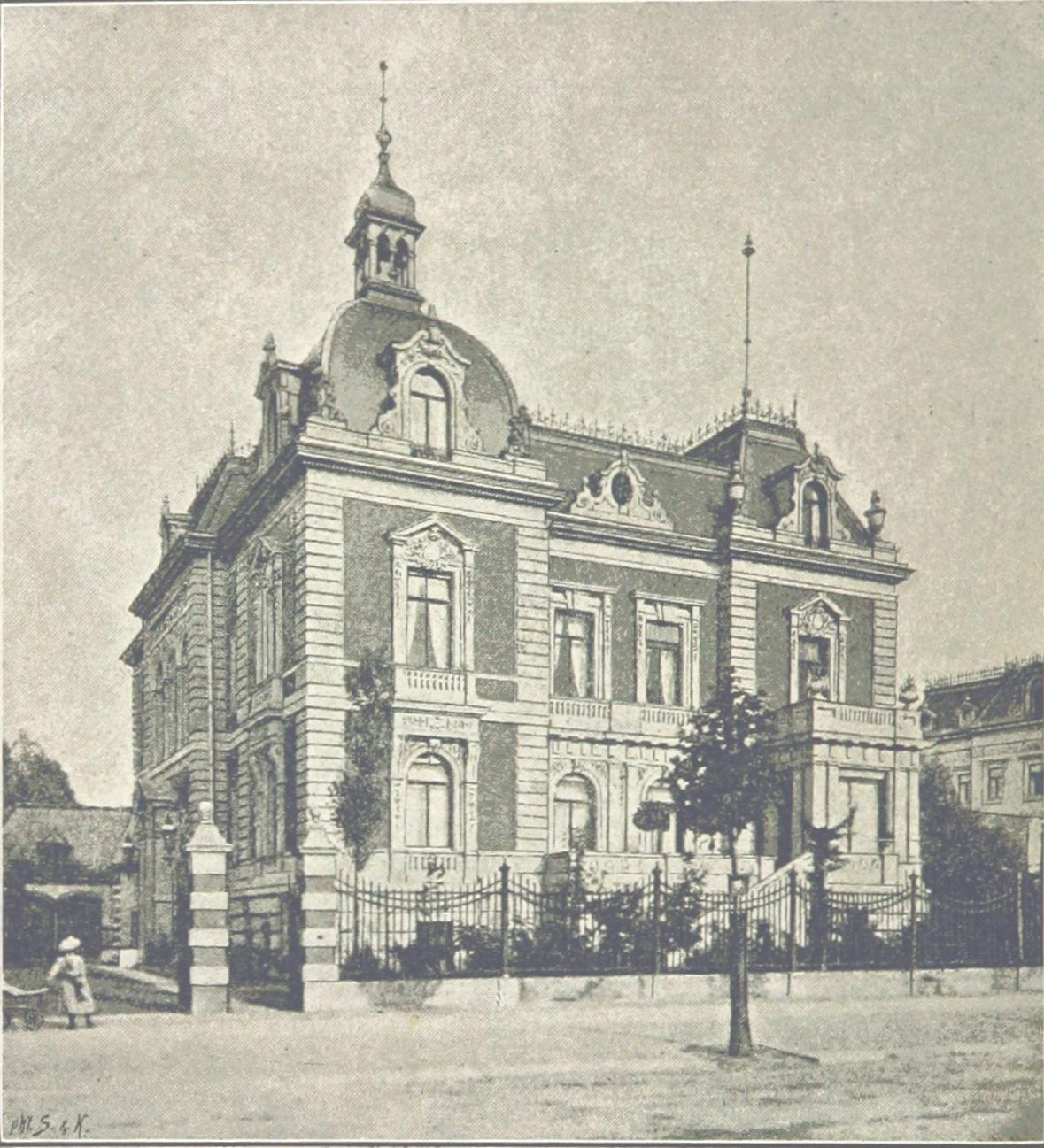
Villa Girbardt, Karl-Tauchnitz-Strasse 17 (1892)

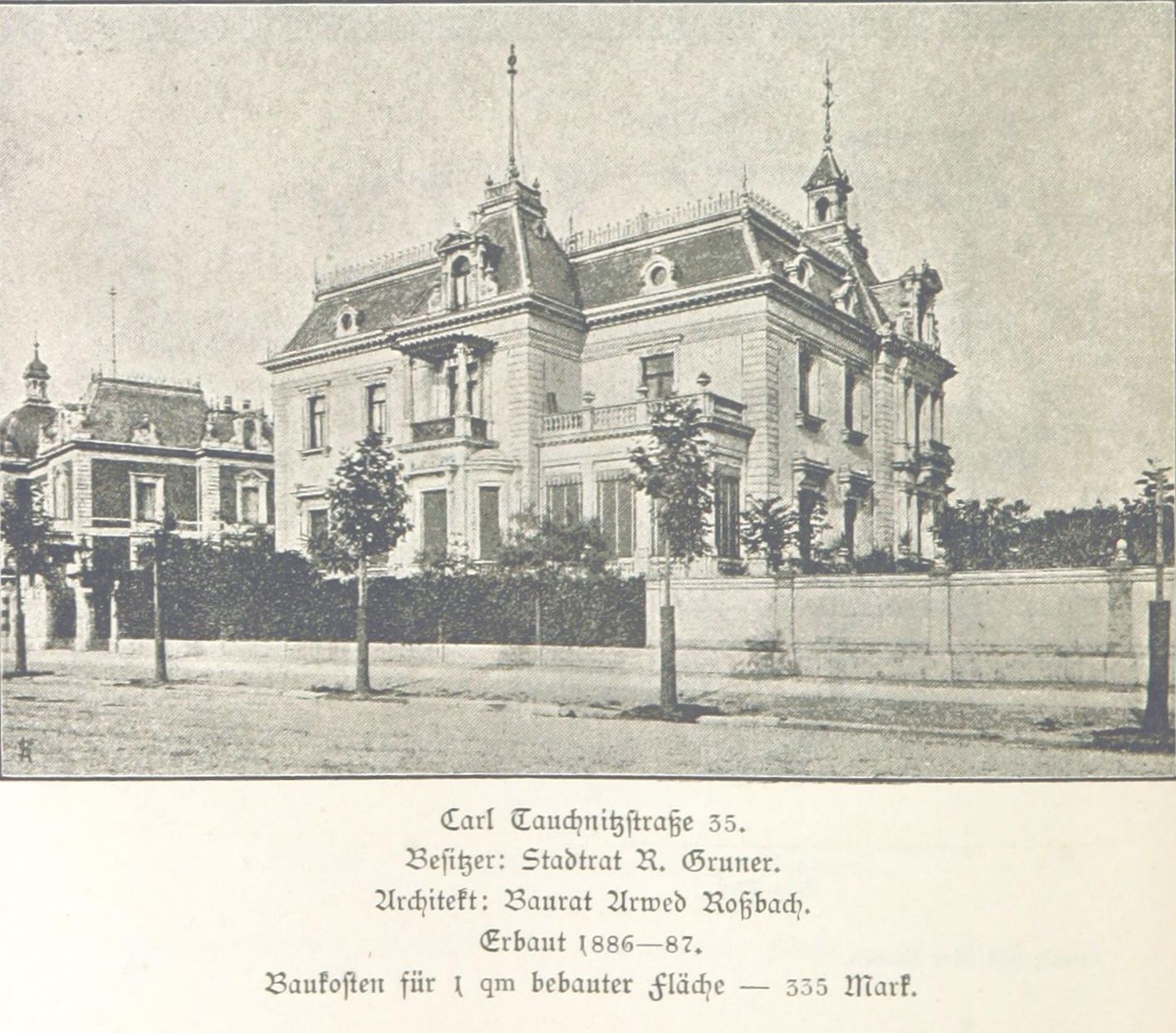
Villa Gruner, Karl-Tauchnitz-Strasse 19 (1886/87)

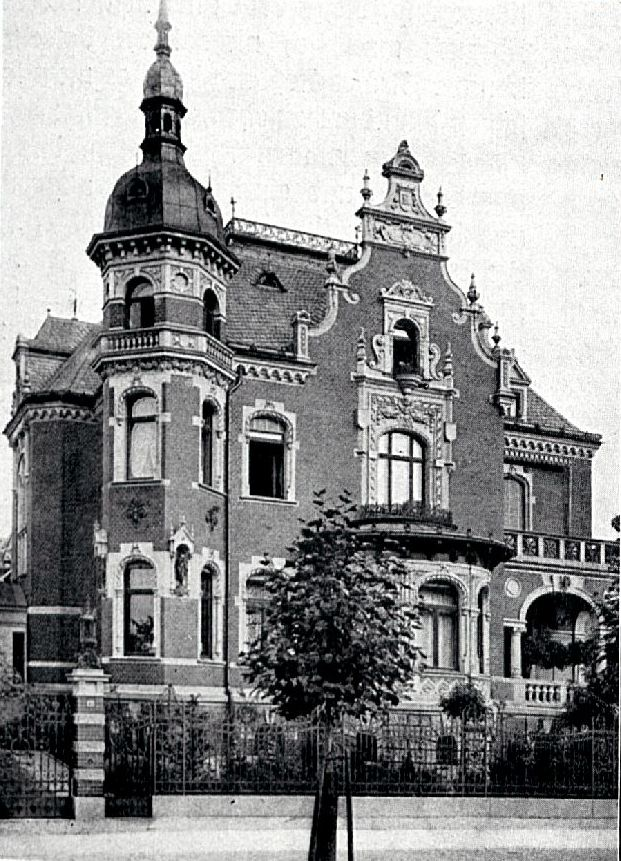
Villa Rehwoldt, Karl-Tauchnitz-Strasse 29 (vor 1905)

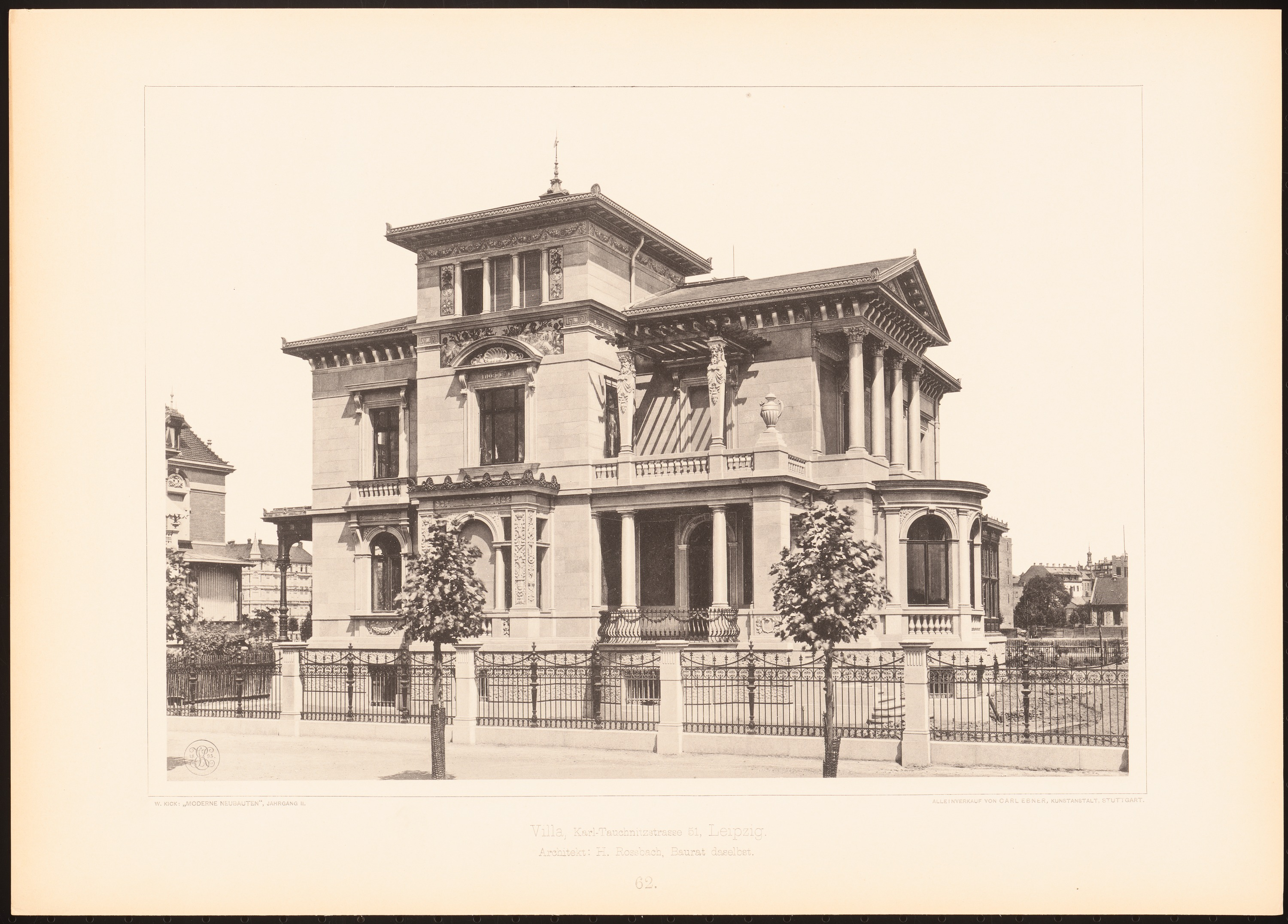
Villa Swiderski, Karl-Tauchnitz-Strasse 35 (1898)

=== 1945–1990 ===
The rubble clearance, which had already begun in 1945/46, was intensified from 1947 onwards by the operation of a light railway across the Musikviertel, which transported the rubble along Karl-Tauchnitz-, Ferdinand-Rhode- and Wundtstrasse to the Bauernwiesen, where the Fockeberg was built.

On 1 October 1946, the former conservatory was reopened as the Staatliche Hochschule für Musik – Mendelssohn Akademie (since 1992 Hochschule für Musik und Theater "Felix Mendelssohn Bartholdy" Leipzig, short: HMT Leipzig) and on 26 April 1947 the Hochschule für Grafik und Buchkunst, short: HGB. The Georgi Dimitroff Museum was opened in the former Imperial Court on 18 June 1952, and the Museum der bildenden Künste also found a new home in the former Imperial Court. In 1953, the Theaterhochschule Leipzig (since 1967 "Hans Otto") was founded after the relocation of the German Theatre Institute, which had been founded in Weimar in 1947, to the Leipzig Musikviertel.

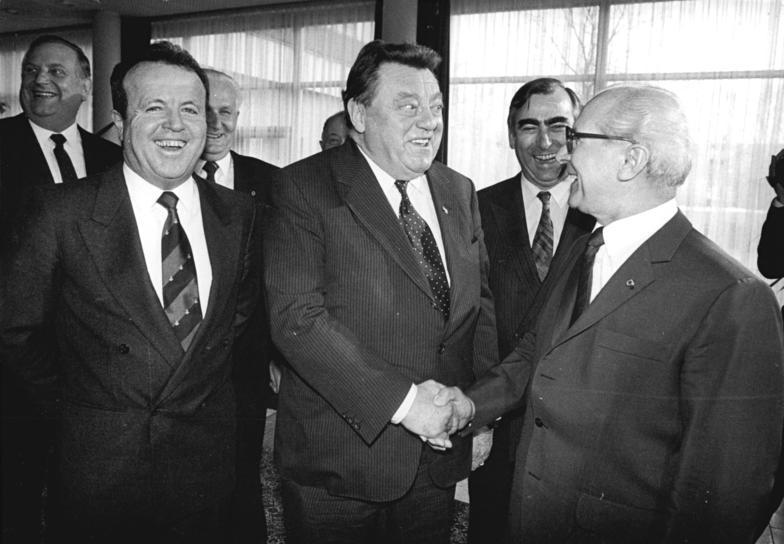
Franz Josef Strauss and Erich Honecker at the Leipzig Trade Fair of spring 1987 in the guest house in Schwägrichenstrasse

In 1955, the vaulting of the Pleißemühlgraben, which had begun in 1951, was completed. In 1968, the ruins of the second Gewandhaus, which could be rebuilt, were demolished, as were some partly well-preserved residential buildings in Ferdinand-Rhode-Strasse. By 1969, a guest house of the Council of Ministers of East Germany had been built in Schwägrichenstrasse, which was used especially during Leipzig Trade Fairs and where the billion-euro loan for East Germany was negotiated between Franz Josef Strauss and Erich Honecker in 1983.

From 1969 onwards, five 11-storey apartment blocks were built in prefabricated construction in the middle of the Musikviertel, which contradicted its former character. In each of these cases, 4 to 5 of the original plots from the time of origin were built over with monotonous large-panel-system buildings by the architect Wolfgang Scheibe (1928–2006). In order to make room for this, some of the old buildings that were still relatively well preserved and partly inhabited were demolished. In Pestalozzistrasse (today Telemannstrasse), a Polytechnic Secondary School named Polytechnische Oberschule Clara Zetkin was built in 1972 and an Extended Secondary School in 1973, which were also attended by the St. Thomas students.

In 1978, three 16-storey high-rise buildings of the PH 16 type, popularly known as "the three equals", were erected in the north-west corner of the Musikviertel on Karl-Tauchnitz-Strasse and Wächterstrasse. Regardless of the typical location, a total of six large plots of war-damaged villas (four by Max Pommer, one each by Arwed Roßbach and Carl Weichardt/Bruno Eelbo) were built over. Originally, the urban planning in the 1960s under the direction of Leipzig's chief architect Horst Siegel (1934–2020) for the entire neighbourhood was even more profound. Four 28-storey high-rise buildings and a "socialist" Musikviertel with large-panel and high-rise buildings were to be built on this site. A drawing of this development concept by Hans-Dietrich Wellner (1934–2013) from 1969 has been preserved.

=== After 1990 ===
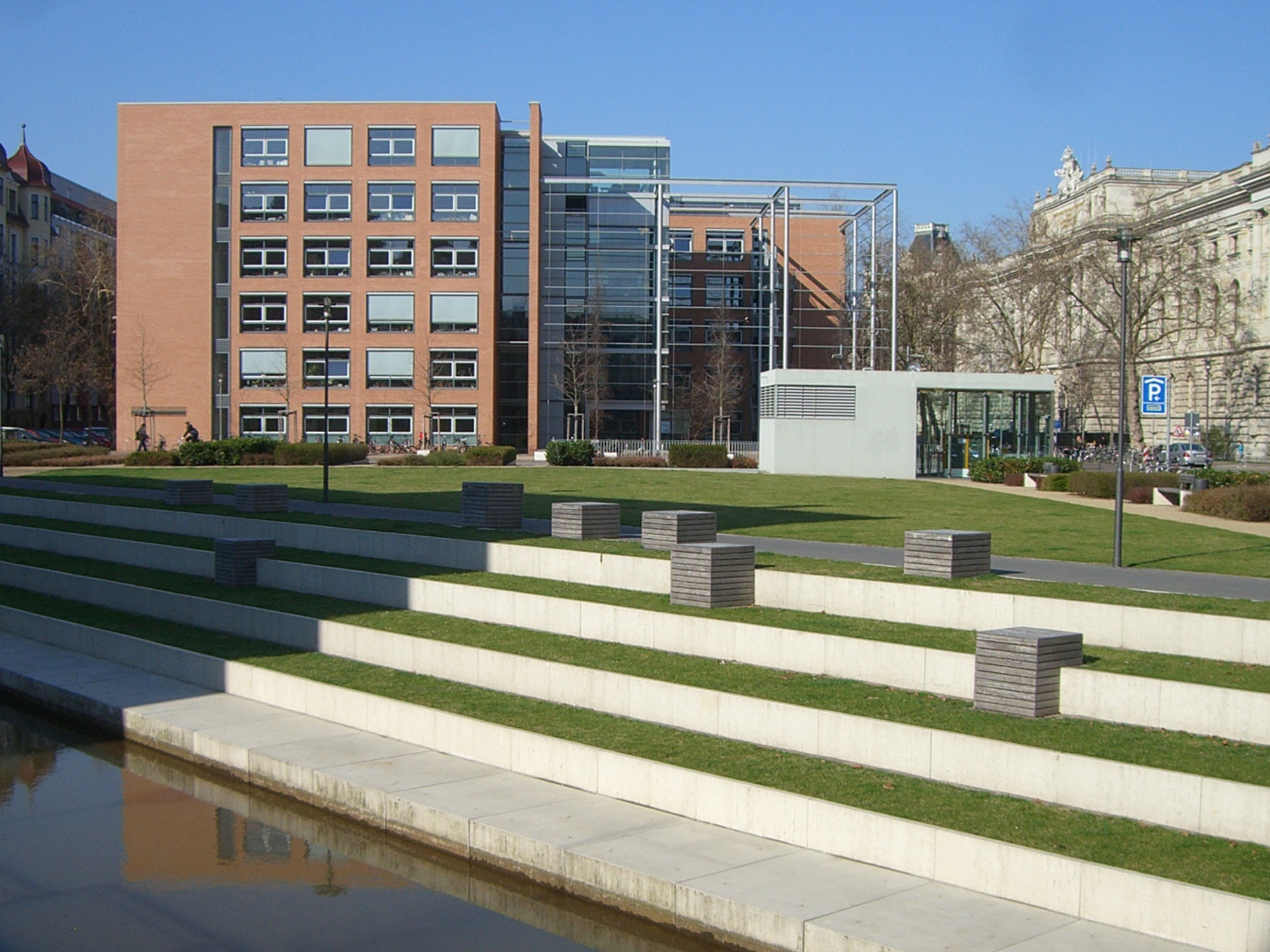
The Humanities Centre of the Leipzig University with the Mendelssohn Embankment at the open Pleißemühlgraben (2010)

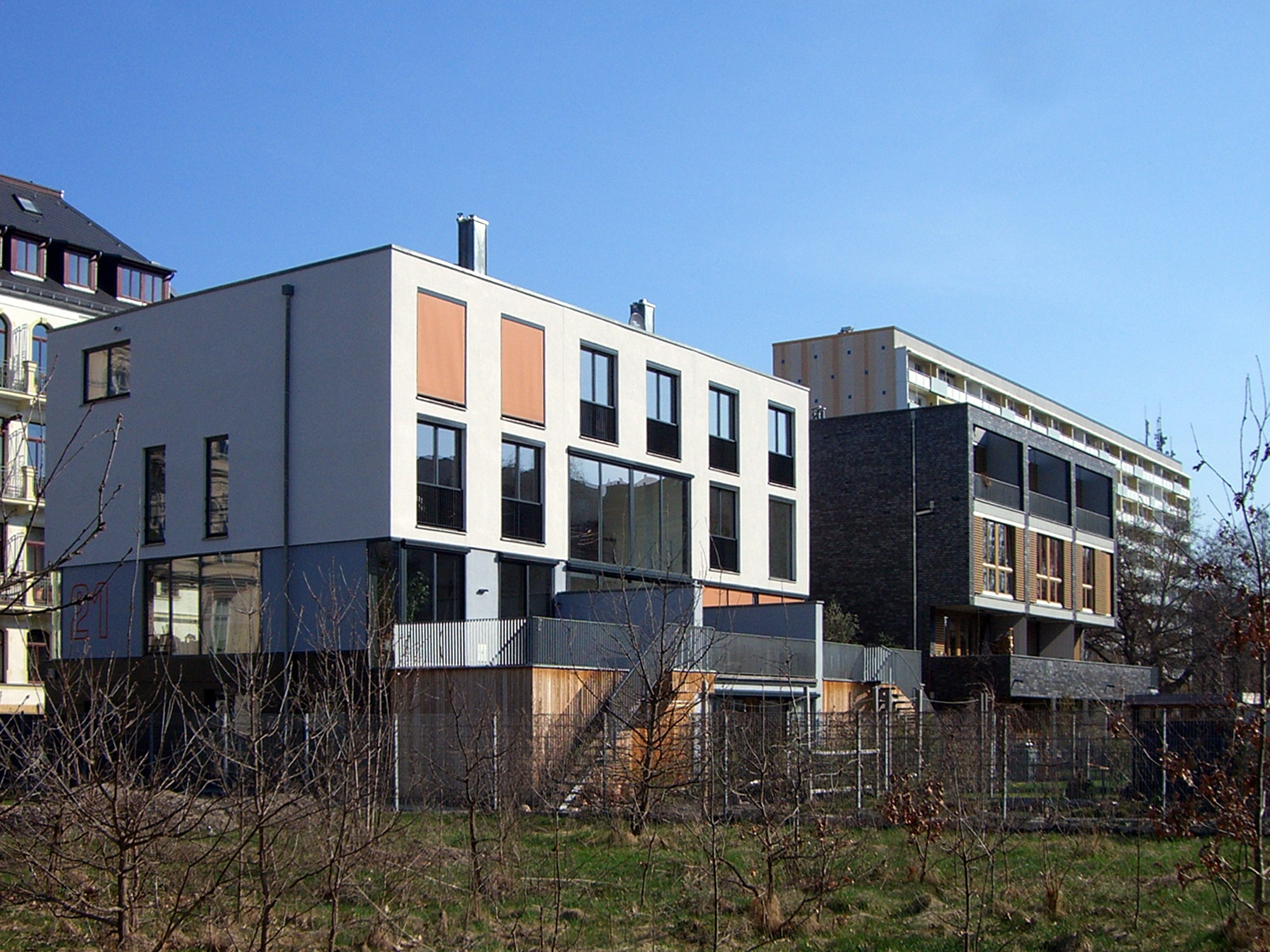
New villa buildings on Haydnstraße (2010)

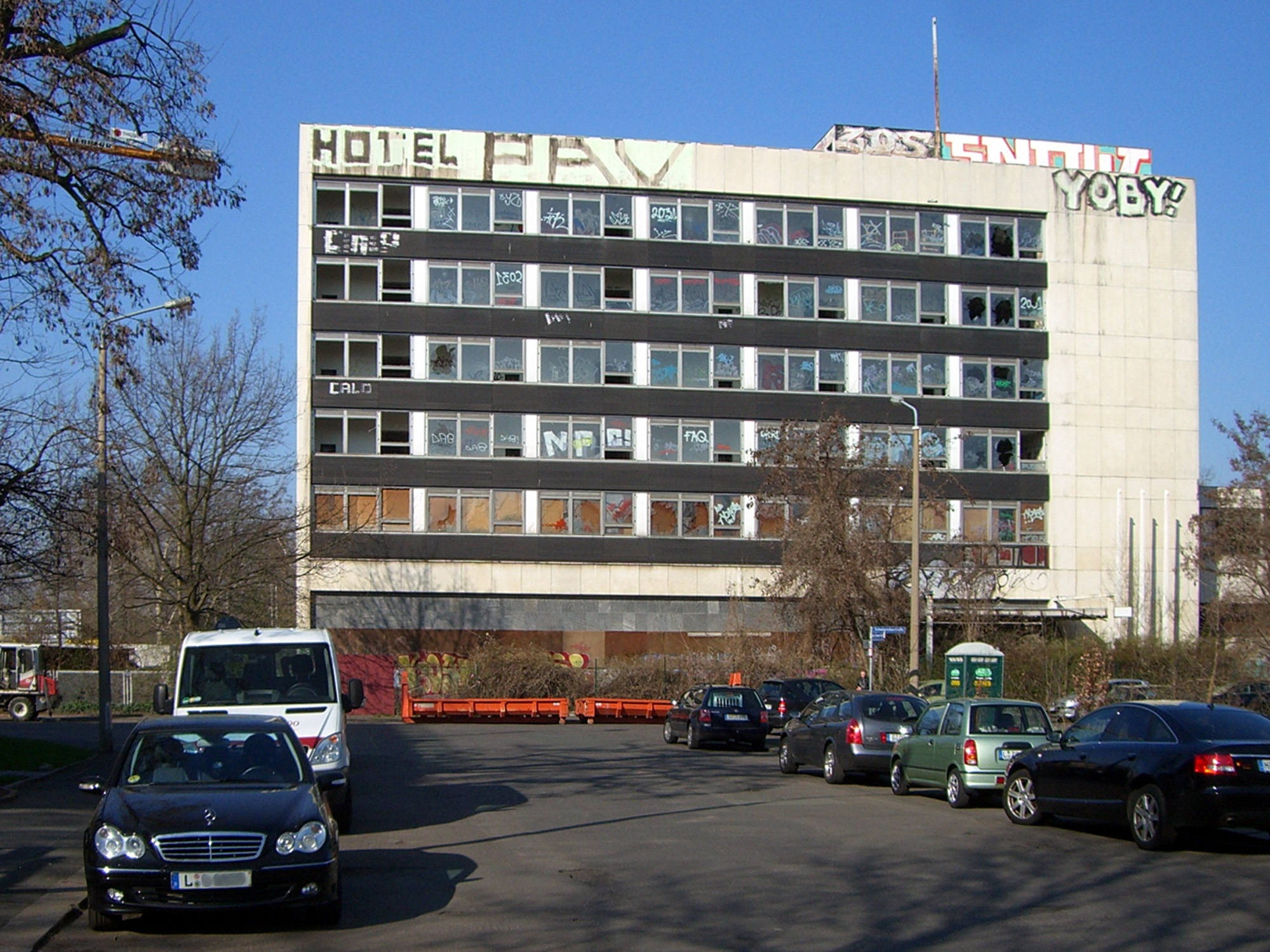
Former guest house of the Council of Ministers of East Germany before renovation (2010)

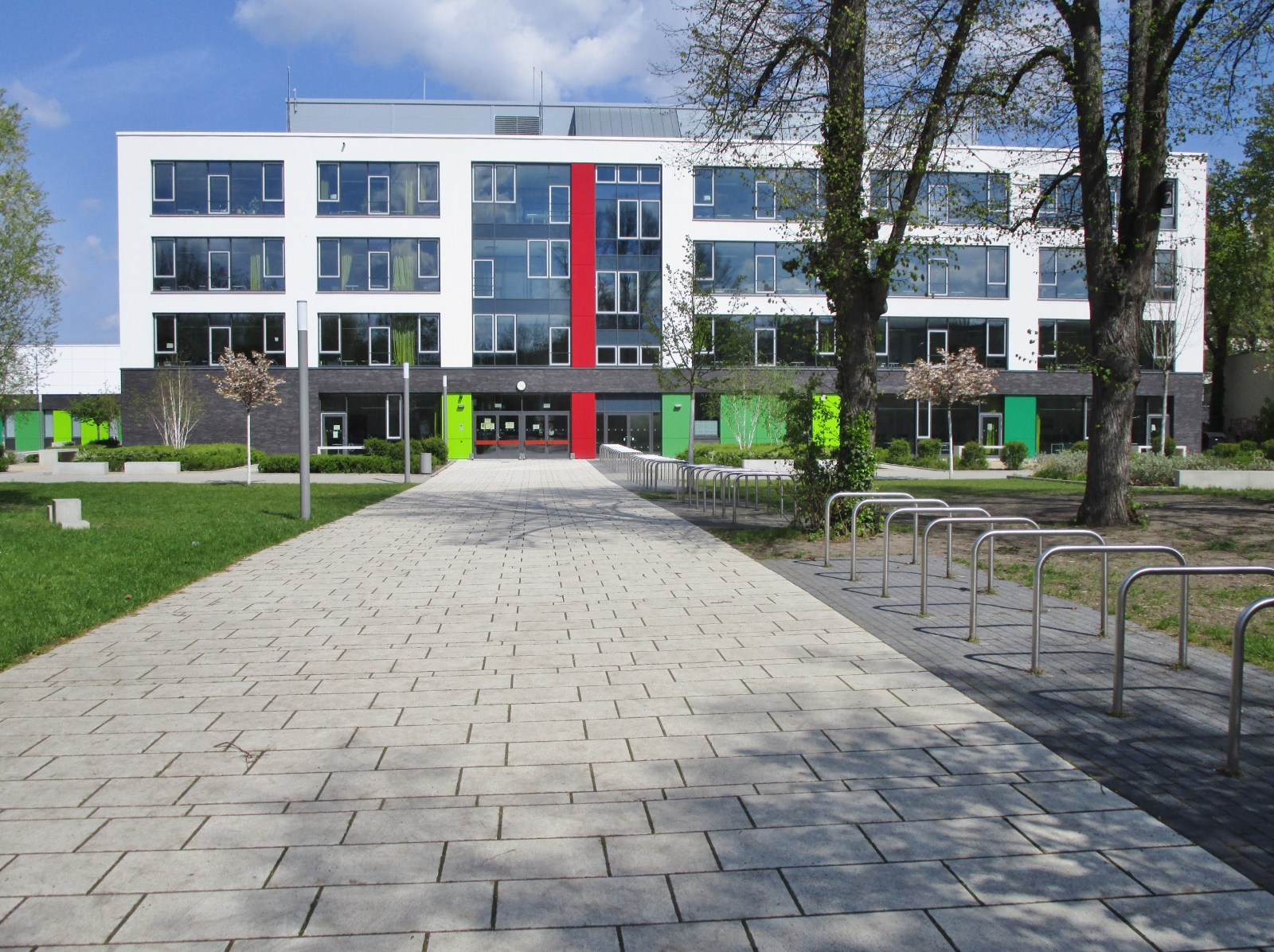
Gerda Taro School, view from the south (2021)

As early as 1990, the first efforts to open the Pleißemühlgraben began with the "Pleiße ans Licht" campaign. In 1998, the first completely completed opening section between Mahlmannstrasse and Braustrasse was handed over; In 2002, the section in front of the Imperial Court building, which was followed by the area behind the prefabricated building on Grassistrasse and finally in 2008 the Mendelssohn-Embankment between Mozartstrasse and Beethovenstrasse. In 2000, the light steles, which glow blue at night along the open section of the body of water in front of the Imperial Court building, were erected and the Fritz von Harck green space, which had been redesigned in wave form, was handed over.

In 1992, the "Hans Otto" Theatre Academy merged with the "Felix Mendelssohn Bartholdy" University of Music and Theatre, and the US Consulate General in the Amerika Haus in Wilhelm-Seyfferth-Strasse was reopened. In 1995, the Saxon Academy of Sciences and Humanities in Leipzig moved to a villa in Karl-Tauchnitz-Strasse and the former "Johannes R. Becher" Literature Institute was re-formed as the German Institute for Literature with an affiliation to the university.

In 1998, the Galerie für Zeitgenössische Kunst Leipzig opened in the Herfurthsche Villa in Karl-Tauchnitz-Strasse, which was supplemented by an exhibition pavilion in 2004. From 2000 to 2002, Leipzig University built the new building for the humanities and social sciences on the site of the former second Gewandhaus. At the time of its completion, the completely rebuilt and expanded university library was also handed over. In the same year, the Federal Administrative Court began its work in the Reich Court building, which had previously been extensively renovated over several years.

Throughout the Musikviertel, numerous villas and town houses were extensively renovated after 1990. A highlight and certain conclusion was the restoration of the residential palace built by Arwed Roßbach at Beethovenstrasse 8 in 2004/2005. But the prefabricated buildings were also modernized. Due to their favourable location to the city and park, they have an occupancy rate far above average for prefabricated buildings. In recent years, numerous new residential and commercial buildings have also been built in the Musikviertel, some of which have a very individual style. While the former guest house of the Council of Ministers, a prime example of GDR modernist architecture, stood vacant and fell into disrepair for more than 20 years, a high-quality new residential complex was built on neighboring land.

The guest house by the architects Wolfgang Scheibe and Frieder Gebhardt has been empty for decades. Finally, in 2020/21, the renovation in line with the preservation of historical monuments began and was completed in 2023.

After the Thomasschule zu Leipzig moved out of the prefabricated building on Telemannstrasse in 2000 and was vacant for a few years, the buildings were demolished. A new school complex was built, which went into operation in the 2017/2018 school year under the name Gymnasium Telemannstrasse. In 2018, the school was given the name Gerda-Taro-Schule – Gymnasium der Stadt Leipzig.

== Architects of the neighbourhood ==
- Max Bösenberg (1847–1918)
- Otto Brückwald (1841–1917)
- Fritz Drechsler (1861–1922)
- Peter Dybwad (1859–1921)
- Bruno Eelbo (1853–1917), architectural firm Weichardt & Eelbo
- Max Fricke (1874–1934)
- Gustav Adolf Geyer (1845–1922)
- Emil Franz Hänsel (1870–1943)
- Max Hasak (1856–1934)
- Arthur Johlige (1857–1937), architectural firm Schmidt & Johlige
- Max Pommer (1847–1915)
- Ernst Riedel (1813–1885)
- Arwed Roßbach (1844–1902)
- Wolfgang Scheibe (1928–2006)
- August Hermann Schmidt (1858–1942), architectural firm Schmidt & Johlige
- Emanuel von Seidl (1856–1919)
- Clemens Thieme (1861–1945)
- Richard Tschammer (1860–1929), Weidenbach & Tschammer Architects
- Georg Weidenbach (1853–1928), Architects Weidenbach & Tschammer
- Karl Weichardt (1846–1906), architectural firm Weichardt & Eelbo
- Julius Zeissig (1855–1930)

== On the history of music in the district ==
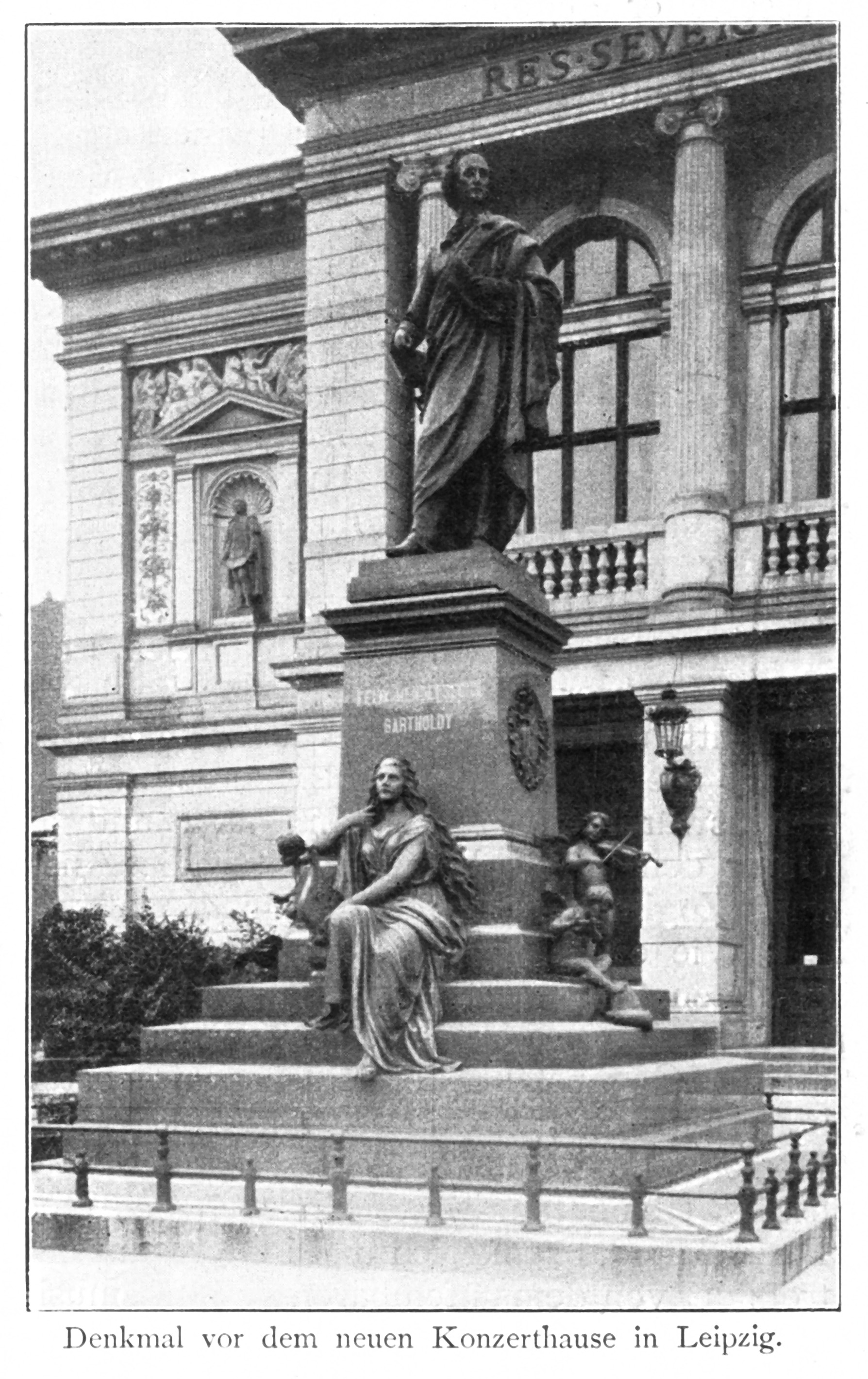
The first Mendelssohn monument from 1892 according to the design by Werner Stein

Since the opening of the New Gewandhaus (1884) and the Conservatory (1887), music history has been written in the Musikviertel for decades. Around 1830, cities in northern and central Germany (Berlin, Dresden, Leipzig) emerged as centres of a new style in music (Romanticism). Until then, the First Viennese School (Haydn, Mozart, Beethoven) had been predominant in contemporary musical life. In Leipzig, Robert Schumann and Clara Schumann prepared the ground for Romanticism and Felix Mendelssohn Bartholdy shaped it into the so-called "Leipzig School" in music. From a music-historical point of view, the time of construction of the buildings falls almost exactly in the middle of the Romantic era in music – in the heyday of High Romanticism. The Leipzig musical tradition established by Mendelssohn in the predecessor buildings in the city centre (between Universitätsstrasse and Neumarkt) has been continued since the mid-1880s in the new buildings in the Musikviertel. The two music institutions in the immediate vicinity of each other – as before at the old location – enabled a mutually beneficial combination of professional training and musical practice, as Mendelssohn had specified as a maxim.

Since 1892, Mendelssohn's monument has stood in front of the main entrance to the Gewandhaus in recognition of his services to music, which the National Socialists had removed in a cloak-and-dagger operation on 9/10 November 1936. It bore the inscription on the front (east side) of the granite pedestal: "Felix Mendelssohn Bartholdy". On the side facing the entrance to the Gewandhaus (west side): "Noble only announces the language of music". A few metres away from the site of the first monument, a portrait stele by the sculptor Walter Arnold (1909–1979) now stands on the Mendelssohn-Embankment. In 1947, the second Mendelssohn monument was unveiled at the front of the ruins of the Gewandhaus on the occasion of the 100th anniversary of the composer's death. This has been moved several times over the years and returned to its old place in 2006. Today, the gaze of the Mendelssohn bust goes to the former temple of the Muses, which no longer exists. In 2008, a replica of the first monument by Werner Stein (1855–1930) was made and erected opposite the main portal ("Mendelssohn Portal") of Leipzig's St. Thomas Church. The monument faces south to the old site in the Musikviertel, which is about 1 kilometre (0.62 mi) away.

From the Old Gewandhaus, the motto above the gallery from the time of the Great Concert was adopted, which now adorned the triangular gable (tympanum) of the new house:

RES SEVERA [EST] VERUM GAUDIUM.

Real joy is a stern matter.

— Seneca the Younger. Moral letters to Lucilius/Letter 23 – via Wikisource.

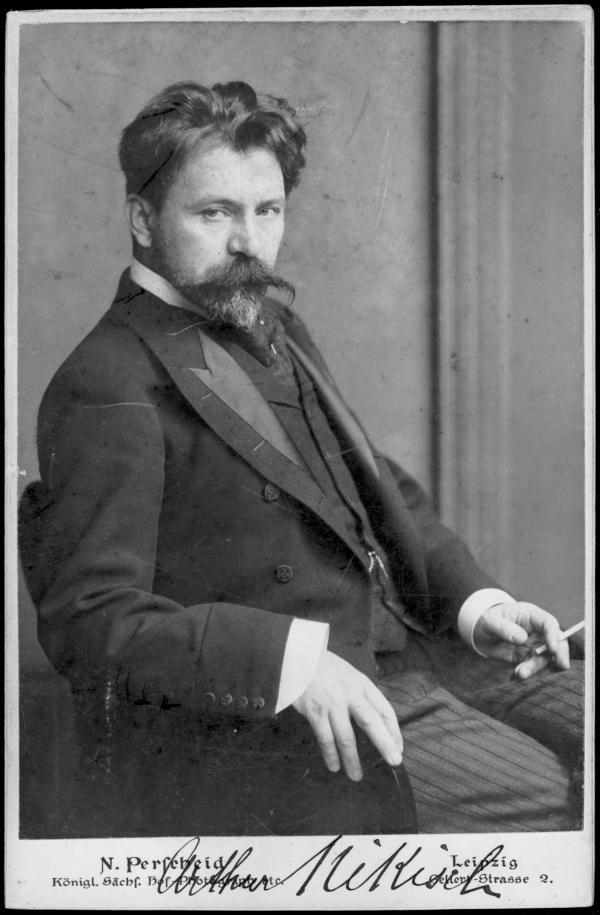
Arthur Nikisch in 1901, Gewandhaus Music Director (Kapellmeister) from 1895 to 1921

The first Gewandhaus Kapellmeister at the Neues Concerthaus was Carl Reinecke, a friend of Felix Mendelssohn. He had already worked in this function at the old house since 1860 and remained in this office until 1895. Since 1930, a monument to the Gewandhaus Kapellmeister Arthur Nikisch by Hugo Lederer (1871–1940) has stood at the rear entrance (staff entrance) of the building. It was Nikisch who led the orchestra to world fame in his 26-year era (1895–1921) as conductor and Gewandhaus Kapellmeister. In 1918, Arthur Nikisch also founded the tradition of New Year's Eve concerts at the second Gewandhaus with the performance of Symphony No. 9 (Beethoven) – a tradition that would later spread worldwide. Arthur Nikisch earned great merits in establishing Eastern European composers (Tchaikovsky, Smetana, Dvořák) in Germany by introducing the people of Leipzig to their music as Kapellmeister at the Neues Theater (Opera House) and at the same time Gewandhaus Kapellmeister. His successor, Wilhelm Furtwängler, was, like Arthur Nikisch, Gewandhaus Kapellmeister and chief conductor of the Berlin Philharmonic. Furtwängler's era at the Gewandhaus, however, only lasted from 1922 to 1928: Bruno Walter, who succeeded Furtwängler until 1933, was expelled from the office of Gewandhaus Kapellmeister as a Jew and emigrated to the USA, where he later became chief conductor of the New York Philharmonic. Hermann Abendroth was the last Gewandhaus conductor at the second Gewandhaus from 1934 until its destruction in 1944.

Until 1944, the Musikviertel was home to the Gewandhaus Orchestra. Some of the most famous conductors of the period between the end of the 19th century and the 1940s also worked at the Gewandhaus as orchestra conductors (Gewandhaus Kapellmeister). A number of works of world music culture (Max Bruch, Anton Bruckner, Antonín Dvořák, Edvard Grieg, Max Reger and others) were premiered here. The composers Johannes Brahms, Peter Tchaikovsky, Edvard Grieg, Richard Strauss, Paul Hindemith, Igor Stravinsky and Hans Pfitzner themselves stood at the conductor's podium to perform one of their works. Often these were the premieres in Leipzig or in Germany. From the many musical highlights over the years, some stand out. Arturo Toscanini gave a guest performance with the New York Philharmonic. The London Philharmonic Orchestra gave a concert with Thomas Beecham at the conductor's stand. What is remarkable about the two guest performances of the foreign orchestras is that they remained the only exceptions. During the six decades from 1884 to 1944, the house was virtually performed solely by the Gewandhaus Orchestra. Guest conductors at the second Gewandhaus, on the other hand, appeared more frequently. Among them were such important ones as Karl Böhm, Fritz Busch, Eugen Jochum, Erich Kleiber, Otto Klemperer and others.

In 1930, the 14-year-old Yehudi Menuhin entered the Leipzig concert stage for the first time here. The list of famous soloists who performed at the second Gewandhaus cannot be approximated due to lack of space. Representative of the many musicians are just a few of the best-known names:

- Pianists: Claudio Arrau, Wilhelm Backhaus, Wladimir Horowitz, Wilhelm Kempff, Elly Ney, Mitja Nikisch, Max von Pauer, Anton Rubinstein, Clara Schumann
- Violinists: Leopold Auer, Willy Burmester, Adolf Busch, Jascha Heifetz, Joseph Joachim, Fritz Kreisler, Wolfgang Schneiderhan, Joseph Szigeti
- Cellists: Pablo Casals, Gaspar Cassadó, Emanuel Feuermann, Ludwig Hoelscher, Julius Klengel, Enrico Mainardi, Gregor Piatigorsky
- Singers: Francisco D'Andrade, Irma Beilke, Erna Berger, Maria Cebotari, Karl Erb, Lorenz Fehenberger, Elena Gerhardt, Hans Hotter, Maria Ivogün, Margarete Klose, Lotte Lehmann, Tiana Lemnitz, Walther Ludwig, Sigrid Onégin, Julius Patzak, Elisabeth Rethberg, Helge Rosvaenge, Erna Sack, Karl Scheidemantel, Heinrich Schlusnus, Leo Slezak, Hermine Spies, Julius Stockhausen
- Choirs: Gewandhaus Choir, University Choir St. Pauli, St. Thomas Choir

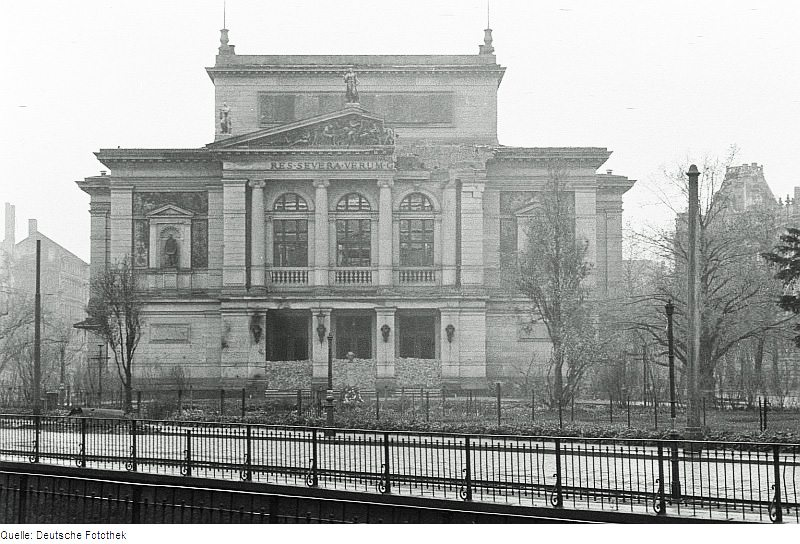
The ruins of the second Gewandhaus in 1947 – in front of it the portrait stele of Mendelssohn by Walter Arnold

Numerous instrumental musicians, soloists and virtuosos, composers and conductors, singers and choirs worked at the second Gewandhaus or had their apprenticeship years as students at the local conservatory. Due to the abundance of names and events, the music history in the neighbourhood can only be sketched. An event of great significance was the blowing up and clearing of the ruins of the Gewandhaus in 1968. For a long time, there had been the prospect of either resurrecting the war-damaged building from the ruins as a concert hall or giving it a new function as a hall of the conservatory (Hochschule für Musik), which was completely destroyed. In the mid-1960s, the city council decided on a demolition solution and the construction of the third Gewandhaus on today's Augustusplatz opposite the opera house. This meant that a former supporting pillar for musical life in the Musikviertel was finally removed. Karl Zumpe, the then Gewandhaus director (head of the Gewandhaus Chancellery), summed up his impressions in the following words:

"On March 29, we watched the collapse of the building from the window of our apartment, and two weeks later a demolition ball began to remove the remains of the wall. A site of world music culture from 1884 to 1944 was razed to the ground."

With the construction of the new concert hall in 2001 at the University of Music and Theatre "Felix Mendelssohn Bartholdy", there is a venue for larger audiences (400 seats) in the Musikviertel for the first time in decades. For comparison, the seating capacity of the second Gewandhaus: the Great Hall had 1,700 seats for concerts and the Small Hall held 650 listeners for all forms of chamber music. In 2003, a memorial plaque was unveiled for the ruins of the Gewandhaus on the east side (corner of Mozartstrasse) of the Leipzig University Humanities centre. On the plaque is the relief of the second Gewandhaus and some information about the master builders, the Gewandhaus Kapellmeisters who worked here and the destruction of the house.

Well-known musicians

In addition to the names listed below as well-known residents, a limited selection of personalities of rank in music history whose place of work was at least temporarily in the Musikviertel:

- Hermann Abendroth (1883–1956), conductor and Gewandhaus Kapellmeister
- Wilhelm Backhaus (1884–1969), pupil at the conservatory and pianist
- Johann Nepomuk David (1895–1977), teacher at the conservatory and composer
- Ottmar Gerster (1897–1969), pupil and teacher at the conservatory, composer
- Ludwig Güttler (born 1943), pupil at the conservatory, trumpet virtuoso and conductor; co-initiator for the reconstruction of the Frauenkirche, Dresden
- Erhard Mauersberger (1903–1982), pupil at the conservatory, conductor, organist and cantor at St Thomas
- Rudolf Mauersberger (1889–1971), pupil at the conservatory, composer and choirmaster
- Edvard Grieg (1843–1907), pupil at the conservatory and composer
- Wilhelm Furtwängler (1886–1954), conductor and Gewandhaus Kapellmeister
- Leoš Janáček (1854–1928), pupil at the conservatory and composer
- Salomon Jadassohn (1831–1902), teacher at the conservatory, pianist, composer and musicologist
- Julius Klengel (1859–1933), teacher at the conservatory, cellist and composer
- Franz Konwitschny (1901–1962), pupil at the conservatory, conductor and Gewandhaus Kapellmeister „without a house“ after 1945
- Kurt Masur (1927–2015), pupil at the conservatory, conductor and Gewandhaus Kapellmeister at the third Gewandhaus
- Arthur Nikisch (1855–1922), conductor, director of studies at the conservatory, Kapellmeister at the Neues Theater and Gewandhaus Kapellmeister
- Max von Pauer (1866–1945), director of studies at the conservatory and pianist
- Günther Ramin (1898–1956), teacher at the conservatory, pianist, organist and cantor of St. Thomas
- Max Reger (1873–1916), teacher at the conservatory, pianist, organist and composer
- Carl Reinecke (1824–1910), director of studies at the conservatory, pianist, conductor and Gewandhaus conductor
- Hugo Riemann (1849–1919), teacher at the conservatory and lecturer at the university, musicologist and author of the Riemann Musiklexikon
- Annerose Schmidt (1936–2022), pianist and rector of the Hochschule für Musik Hanns Eisler Berlin
- Karl Straube (1873–1950), teacher at the conservatory, organist and cantor of St. Thomas, director of the Kirchenmusikalisches Institut (Church Music Institute, Leipzig)
- George Szell (1897–1970), pupil at the conservatory, conductor, pianist and composer
- Robert Teichmüller (1863–1939), teacher at the conservatory and pianist
- Bruno Walter (1876–1962), conductor, pianist, composer and Gewandhaus Kapellmeister

Notable residents

- Elsa Asenijeff (1867–1941), writer, partner of Max Klinger – Schwägrichenstrasse 11
- Max Ariowitsch (1880–1969), fur trader and benefactor – Karl-Tauchnitz-Strasse 14 (Villa Ariowitsch/war loss)
- Rudolf Heinrich Brockhaus (1864–1943), publisher and printer owner – Beethovenstrasse 8 (Roßbachhaus)
- Otto Brückwald (1841–1917), architect – Schwägrichenstrasse 11
- Hermann Credner (1841–1913), geologist and paleontologist – Karl-Tauchnitz-Strasse 11 (Villa Herfurth)
- Alfred Dörffel (1821–1905), music writer, music collector and music publisher of classic editions (Musikalienhandlung Dörffel) – Mozartstrasse 7 (war loss)
- Peter Dybwad (1859–1921), architect – Ferdinand-Rhode-Strasse 32 (Villa Dybwad/war loss)
- Alfred Freyberg (1892–1945), Nazi politician and Mayor of Leipzig – Karl-Tauchnitz-Strasse 17 (Villa Girbardt/war loss)
- Georg Friedrich Giesecke (1853–1930), type foundry and printing press manufacturer – Karl-Tauchnitz-Strasse 21 (Villa Georg Giesecke)
- Fritz von Harck (1855–1917), art historian, art collector and patron of the arts – Karl-Tauchnitz-Strasse 6 (Villa Harck)
- Hans Hartung (1904–1989), painter and graphic artist – Mozartstrasse 1
- Julius Edgar Herfurth (1865–1950), newspaper publisher – Karl-Tauchnitz-Strasse 11 (Villa Herfurth)
- Georg H. S. Hirzel (1867–1924), publisher, bookseller, grandson of the publisher Salomon Hirzel – Schwägrichenstrasse 13
- Ernst Hölder (1901–1990), mathematician
- Arthur Johlige (1857–1937), architect – Mozartstrasse 21a (Villa Johlige)
- Erich Kästner (1899–1974), writer and screenwriter – Hohe Strasse 51
- Wilhelm Klemm (1881–1968), poet and publisher, son-in-law of Alfred Kröner – Karl-Tauchnitz-Strasse 33 (Villa Cichorius)
- Alfred Kröner (1861–1922), publisher and editor of the magazine Die Gartenlaube – Karl-Tauchnitz-Strasse 33 (Villa Cichorius)
- Georg Langbein (1849–1909), chemist and entrepreneur – Karl-Tauchnitz-Strasse 23 (Haus Langbein)
- Paul List (1869–1929), publisher – Ferdinand-Rhode-Strasse 2 (Villa Hermann Beckmann/war loss)
- Hans Marquardt (1920–2004), publisher – Mozartstrasse 17
- Max von Pauer (1866–1945), pianist and director of the conservatory
- Josef Mathias Petersmann (1864–1942), publisher and printer owner – Schwägrichenstrasse 23 (Villa Petersmann)
- Nikolaus Pevsner (1902–1983), art and architectural historian – Schwägrichenstrasse 11
- Günter Raphael (1903–1960), composer and university lecturer – Schwägrichenstrasse 11
- Hans Heinrich Reclam (1840–1920), publisher bookseller and printer owner, heir and owner of the Reclam publishing house, – Karl-Tauchnitz-Strasse 35 (Villa Swiderski/war loss)
- Rentarō Taki (1879–1903), Japanese composer – Ferdinand-Rhode-Strasse 7 (today Mozartstrasse 6)
- Auguste Schmidt (1833–1902), writer and women's rights activist – Grassistrasse 33 (today part of a large-panel-system building)
- Ernst Arthur Seemann (1829–1904), publisher – Wächterstrasse 32 (Villa Seemann=Villa Ury)
- Carl Seffner (1861–1932), sculptor – Grassistrasse 17
- W. F. A. Siegel (?–?), music publisher (Verlag Kistner & Siegel) – Beethovenstrasse 8 (Roßbachhaus)
- Sieskind Sieskind (1833–1925), banker, millionaire and privy councillor of commerce – Wächterstrasse 15 (Villa Sieskind)
- Jakob Sieskind (1872–1943), son of Sieskind Sieskind, lawyer, banker and victim of the Nazi – Wächterstrasse 15 (Villa Sieskind)
- Karl Straube (1873–1950), organist and cantor of St. Thomas – Grassistrasse 30 (war loss)
- Adolf von Strümpell (1853–1925), physician, university lecturer and rector of the Leipzig University
- Rudolf Swiderski (1878–1909), German chess master – Karl-Tauchnitz-Strasse 35 (Villa Swiderski/war loss)
- Ulrich Thieme (1865–1922), art historian – Ferdinand-Rhode-Strasse 36 (Villa Thieme/war loss)
- Paul Thorer (1858–1920), fur trader – Beethovenstrasse 35 (Villa Thorer/war loss)
- Robert Hermann Tillmanns (1844–1927), physician and pediatric surgeon – Wächterstrasse 30 (Villa Tillmanns)
- Amadeus Webersinke (1920–2005), pianist, organist and university teacher – Schwägrichenstrasse 15
- Mary Wigman (1886–1973), dancer, choreographer and dance teacher, pioneer of modern dance – Mozartstrasse 17
- Wilhelm Wundt (1832–1920), philosopher, physiologist and psychologist – Schwägrichenstrasse 17
- Karl Zumpe (1924–2001), Gewandhaus Director – Beethovenstrasse 8 (Roßbachhaus)

== Streets ==
In the Musikviertel, the streets running north-south are mainly named after Leipzig donors and those running east-west are mainly named after composers. Some of the namesakes of the streets are also honorary citizens of Leipzig. The naming of the streets, which were marked with letters and numbers at the time of planning and development, took place from 1885 onwards.

=== North-south direction ===
- Karl-Tauchnitz-Strasse, after Karl Tauchnitz (1798–1884), publisher and benefactor; the street has its beginning at the northeastern border of the neighbourhood opposite the New Town Hall and runs first straight east-west and then mostly in an arc in a north-south direction.
- Schwägrichenstrasse, after Christian Friedrich Schwägrichen (1775–1853), botanist and university teacher
- Ferdinand-Rhode-Strasse, after Ferdinand Rhode (1802–1872), merchant and benefactor
- Grassistrasse, after Franz Dominic Grassi (1801–1880), merchant and benefactor
- Wilhelm-Seyfferth-Strasse, after Wilhelm Theodor Seyfferth (1807–1881), banker, railway pioneer and benefactor
- Simsonstrasse (1933–1945 Von-der-Pfordten-Strasse, after Theodor von der Pfordten (1873–1923), lawyer and so-called Blutzeuge of the Nazi movement); before and after Martin Eduard von Simson (1810–1899), jurist and first president of the Imperial Court
- Lampestrasse, parallel street to Simsonstrasse, both separated by the Pleißemühlgraben, which is still filled in at this point, after Carl Lampe (1804–1889), entrepreneur, patron of the arts and railway pioneer
- Simsonplatz, forecourt of the Federal Administrative Court (former Reichsgericht), 1900–1947 Reichsgerichtsplatz, 1947–1949 Präsident-Friedrichs-Platz, after the Saxon politician Rudolf Friedrichs (1892–1947), 1949–1997 Georgi-Dimitroff-Platz, after Georgi Dimitroff (1882–1949), Bulgarian communist and defendant in the Reichstag fire trial
- Wundtstrasse (in part), after Wilhelm Wundt (1832–1920), philosopher, physiologist and psychologist

=== East-west direction ===
- Karl-Tauchnitz-Strasse, see above
- Wächterstrasse (1949–1991 Dimitroffstrasse); before and after Karl Georg von Wächter (1797–1880), jurist and rector of the Leipzig University
- Beethovenstrasse, after Ludwig van Beethoven (1770–1827), composer
- Mozartstrasse, after Wolfgang Amadeus Mozart (1756–1791), composer
- Haydnstraße, after Joseph Haydn (1732–1809), composer
- Robert-Schumann-Strasse, after Robert Schumann (1810–1856), composer
- Telemannstrasse (formerly Pestalozzistrasse), after Georg Philipp Telemann (1681–1767), Composer
