= Pearly =

Pearly or pearlie may refer to:

== People ==
- Pearly Black (born 1967), Australian singer
- Pearly Brown (1915–1986), American singer, guitarist and street musician
- Pearlie Craft Dove (1920–2015), African-American educator
- Pearlie Mae Feldman, one of the victims of the 2001 Nevada County shootings
- Pearlie Kennedy Pettway (1920–1982), American quilter
- Pearly Tan (born 2000), Malaysian badminton player
- Pearly Gates (singer), stage name of Viola Billups (born 1946), American disco and soul singer and member of girl group The Flirtations
- Pearlies, slang for members of the Pearly Kings and Queens charitable tradition

== Arts and entertainment ==
- "Pearly", a Space: Above and Beyond episode
- Pearlie, an animated TV series
- Pearly, a fictional male creature in Marina, a 2004 Philippine TV series
- Damon Pearly, a fictional character in Friday After Next, a 2002 comedy film
- Pearly Spencer, a homeless man featured in the 1967 song "Days of Pearly Spencer" by David McWilliams
- "Pearly*", a song by Radiohead from the EP Airbag/How Am I Driving?

== Places in the United States ==
- Pearly, Virginia, an unincorporated community
- Pearly Lake, in the town of Rindge, New Hampshire

== See also ==
- Purley (disambiguation)
- Perły, a village in northern Poland
- Pearl (disambiguation)
