= Purley =

Purley may refer to:

== People ==
- Purley (name), including a list of people and fictional characters with the name

== Places ==
- Purley, London, England
  - Purley railway station
  - Purley Way, out-of-town retail area
- Purley on Thames, Berkshire, England
- Purley, North Carolina, United States
- Purley, Texas, United States

== See also ==
- Purleigh, Essex, England
- Pearly (disambiguation)
