= List of streets and squares in Leipzig =

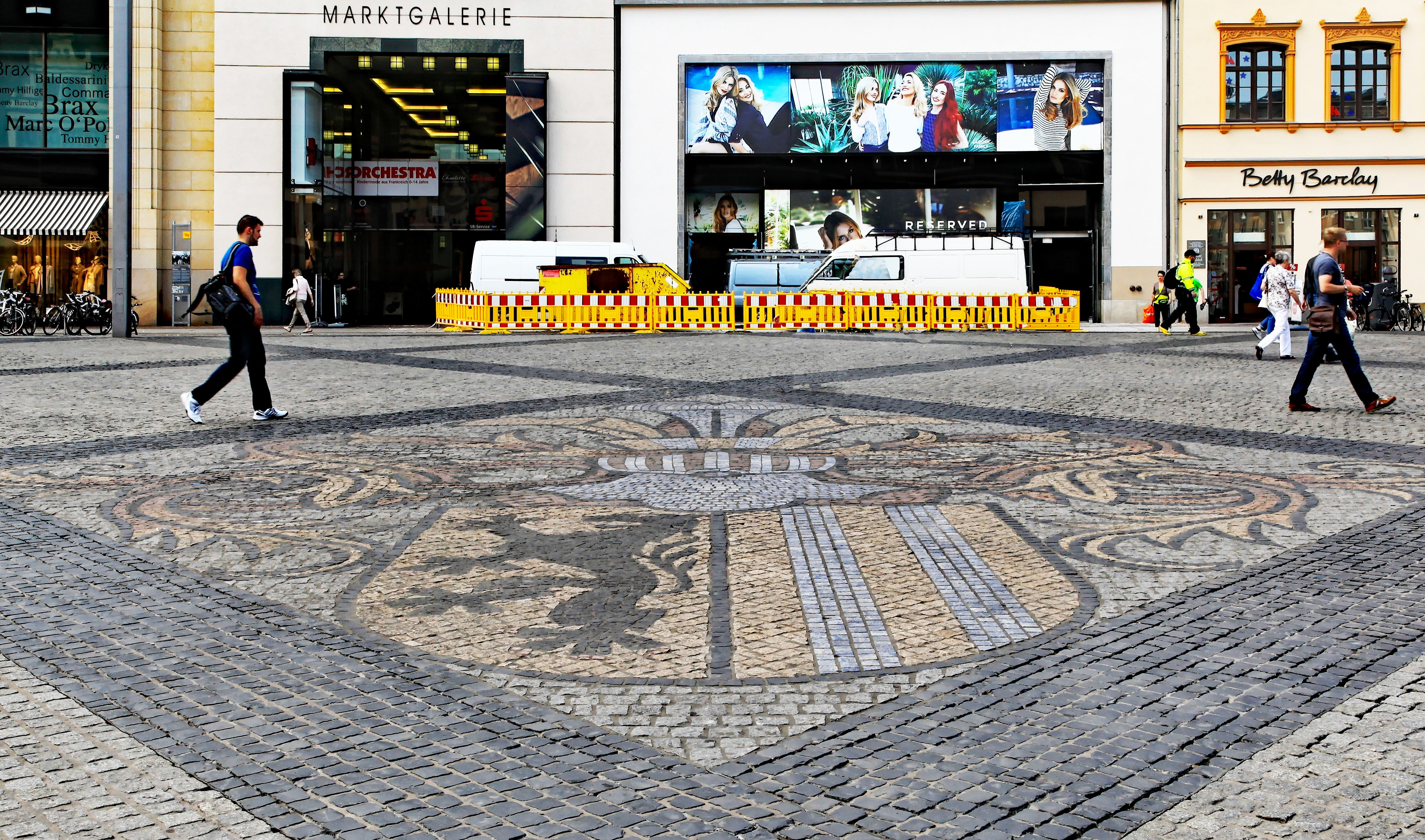
The square, which bears the name "Markt", is considered the center of the city.

In this list of streets and squares in Leipzig, the meanings and circumstances of the naming of streets and squares in the saxon city of Leipzig in Germany and their history are shown. Currently valid street names are given in bold letters, names that are no longer valid after renaming or development are in italics. As far as possible, existing or former institutions, monuments, special buildings or well-known residents are also listed.

== A ==
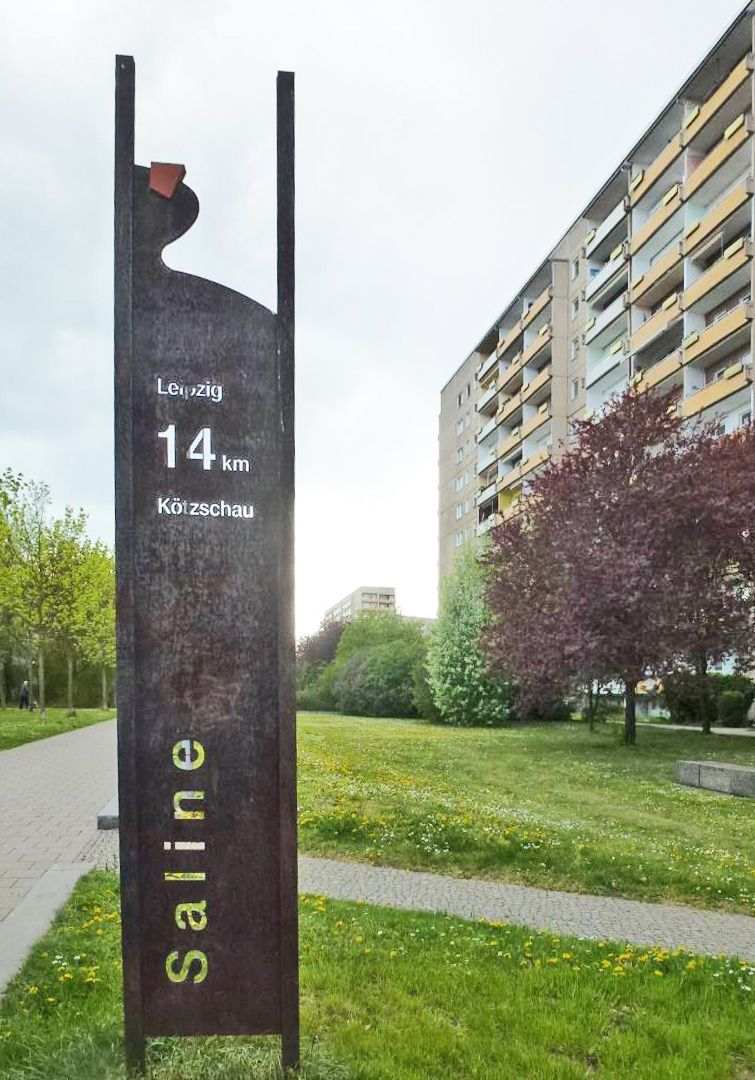
Stele on the Alte Salzstrasse in Grünau (2015) - Saline means saltworks

Albrecht-Dürer-Platz – the square green space is located in the Südvorstadt and was initially nameless after its creation at the end of the 19th century. On the occasion of the 400th anniversary of his death, it was decided to name the complex after Albrecht Dürer in 1928.

Alfred-Kästner-Strasse – in the Südvorstadt. The street initially had the designation "Straße F" on the development plan of the Südvorstadt. In 1876 it was named after the Prussian general Moltkestrasse and on 1 August 1945 it was renamed Alfred-Kästner-Strasse, after the resistance fighter Alfred Kästner, who had lived in house no. 20 on Moltkestrasse.

Alte Salzstrasse - road with interruptions in Lindenau and Grünau. It consists of three sections and was the chaussee to Lützen in the west of Leipzig before 1793. The name means Old Salt Road, it is a reminder that heavy loaded freight wagons from the saltworks west of Markranstädt and later also from the Dürrenberg saltworks went to Leipzig via the road.

Andreasstrasse – in the Südvorstadt. It connects Scharnhorststrasse with Hardenbergstrasse at the level of Alexis-Schumann-Platz and is named after the Andreaskirche (St. Andrew Church), which stood there from 1893 to 1958. Until November 1899, it was simply called Strasse hinter der Andreaskirche (Street behind the St. Andrew Church).

Arno-Nitzsche-Strasse - connects the localities of Connewitz and Marienbrunn in the south. It is named after the gasworks employee Arno Nitzsche (1897–1948), who himself died while trying to save a colleague in an accident at work.

Arthur-Hoffmann-Strasse – in the localities of Zentrum-Süd, Südvorstadt and Connewitz. Until 1945, the street was divided into two parts and consisted of Bayrische Strasse (also spelled Bayersche Strasse) from Bayrischer Platz to today's Richard-Lehmann-Strasse and Äußere Bayrische Strasse from Richard-Lehmann-Strasse to today's Wiedebachplatz. Both streets were merged in 1945 and named after the resistance fighter Arthur Hoffmann, who had lived in this street.

August-Bebel-Strasse – in the Südvorstadt. The street runs in a north-south direction and connects Dufourstrasse in the north with Windscheidstrasse in the south. From 1876 to 1945 it was called Kaiser-Wilhelm-Strasse. The street is named after the master turner August Bebel, who was also a co-founder of the Social Democratic Workers' Party of Germany.

Augustusplatz – the largest square in the city, east of the city centre. The square was initially called Grimmaischer Thorplatz and was named in 1839 after Frederick Augustus I of Saxony, the first king of Saxony. From 1945 to 1990 it was named Karl-Marx-Platz after the German philosopher Karl Marx.

== B ==
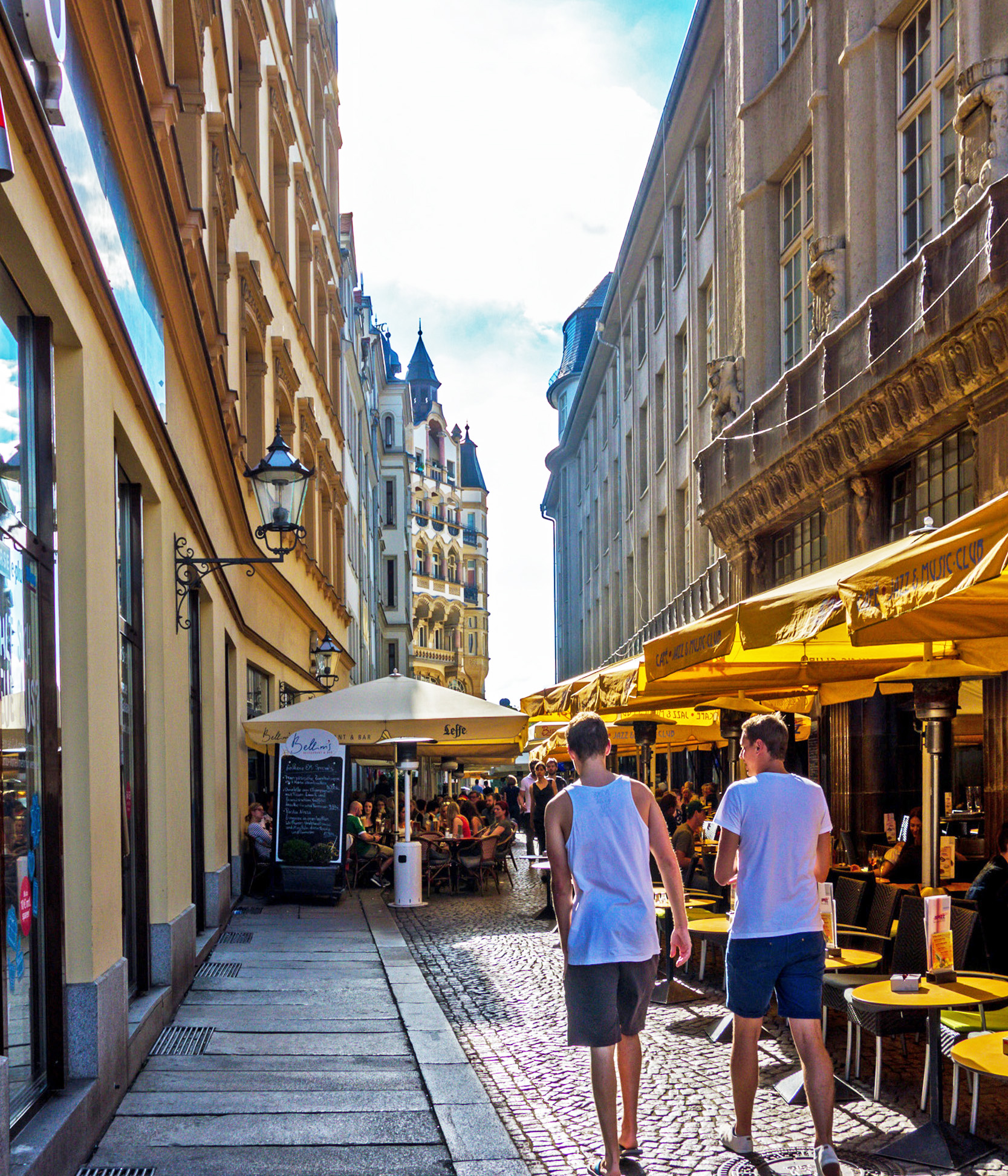
Barfußgäßchen (2016)

Barfußgäßchen - short pedestrian street in the city centre. It connects the market with the Dittrichring. It is named after the Franciscans, who were also called discalced or barefooters because they wore no shoes or at most sandals.

Bernhard-Göring-Strasse – in the localities of Zentrum-Süd, Südvorstadt and Connewitz. It was called Elisenstrasse after Princess Elisabeth of Saxony from 1843 and has borne the name of the SPD politician Bernhard Göring since 1950.

Blücherplatz – in the city centre in front of Leipzig Hauptbahnhof, was the name of today's Willy-Brandt-Platz from 1870 to 1945, named after the Prussian field marshal Gebhard Leberecht von Blücher.

Blücherstrasse – in Möckern, was founded in 1950 in memory of the Battle of Möckern (Battle of Leipzig), Blücher was commander-in-chief of the Prussian troops. Furthermore, from 1870 to 1945, Blücherstrasse was the name of today's Kurt-Schumacher-Strasse in the centre.

Bornaische Strasse - in Connewitz, Lößnig and Dölitz-Dösen as well as in the Markkleeberg locality of Markkleeberg-Ost, begins at the Connewitzer Kreuz and ends at the Markkleeberger See. Historically part of the Via Imperii. Named after the town of Borna. In Leipzig, not in Markkleeberg, from 1950 to 1991 Fritz-Austel-Strasse.

Brandvorwerkstrasse – in the Südvorstadt, named after the former Brandvorwerk, which was set on fire in 1593 during the Leipzig Calvinist storm.

Brühl – in the city centre. Brühl refers to a swampy terrain – north of the Brühl was originally the Parthenaue (meadows of the river Parthe). The Brühl was part of the Via Regia and until the Second World War the busiest street in Leipzig.

Burgplatz – in the city centre. It was built around 1900 on parts of the Pleissenburg site, when it was demolished in 1897 to make room for the New Town Hall. The town hall was deliberately built a little out of town to create a new town square.

Burgstrasse – in the city centre. The former Burggasse was already the connection between the city and Pleissenburg in the Middle Ages.

== D ==
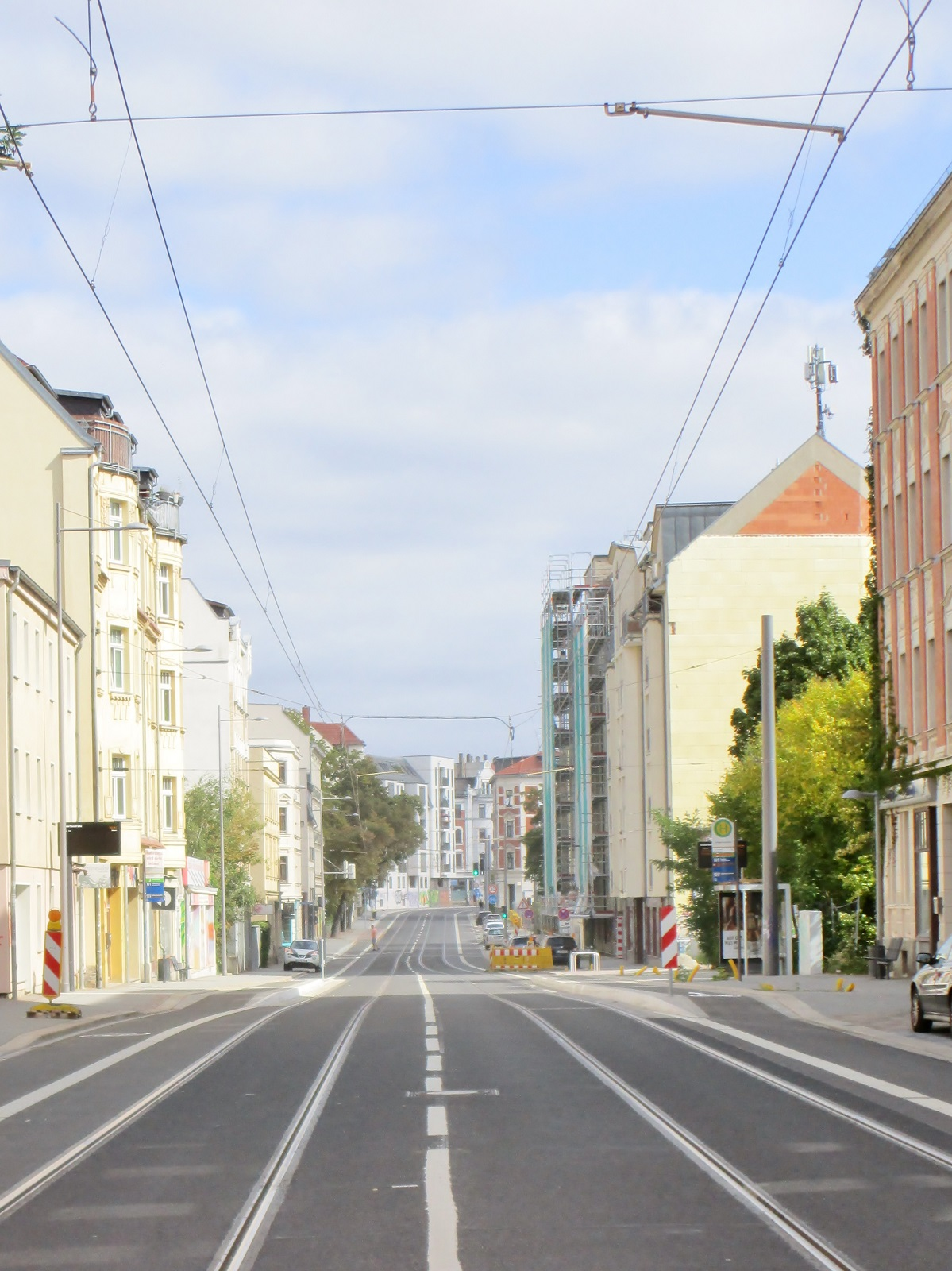
Section of Dieskaustrasse in Kleinzschocher (2025)

Denkmalsallee – in Breitenfeld. The translation is Monument alley, but in reality it is a path leading across the field to the monument that commemorates the Battle of Breitenfeld (1631) and the victorious Gustavus Adolphus.

Dieskaustrasse – in the southwestern localities of Kleinzschocher, Großzschocher and Knauthain-Hartmannsdorf, main connecting road in a north-south direction through the aforementioned localities. The street was built between 1896 and 1904 after the Dieskau family as former owners of the manors of Kleinzschocher, Großzschocher and Knauthain. From 1950 to 1991 it was called the Street of the Komsomol.

Dittrichring – western part of the inner city ring road, named after the mayor of Leipzig, Rudolf Dittrich (1855–1929). Previous names were An der Pleiße and Thomasring.

Dreilindenstrasse – in Lindenau, leads from Lindenauer Markt to Zschochersche Strasse. It formed the eastern access from the Via Regia to Lindenau. Until 1874 it was called Herrenstrasse, then until 31 December 1907 Lindenstrasse. Its current name is derived from the Gasthof Drei Linden (The three lime trees inn), which was first mentioned in 1495 and has borne this name since 1700. The inn was located at the junction with the Via Regia at the time, and today the theatre venue Musikalische Komödie is located there.

== E ==
Eisenbahnstrasse - in four eastern localities Neustadt-Neuschönefeld, Volkmarsdorf and Sellerhausen. The street name means in English: Railway Street. From 1835 to 1879, the tracks of the Leipzig–Dresden railway were located here on an embankment. After the line was relocated, the railway embankment was replaced by a connecting main road, which was given the name Eisenbahnstrasse in 1901. From 1945 to 1991, it was called Ernst-Thälmann-Strasse, after the communist politician Ernst Thälmann.

== F ==
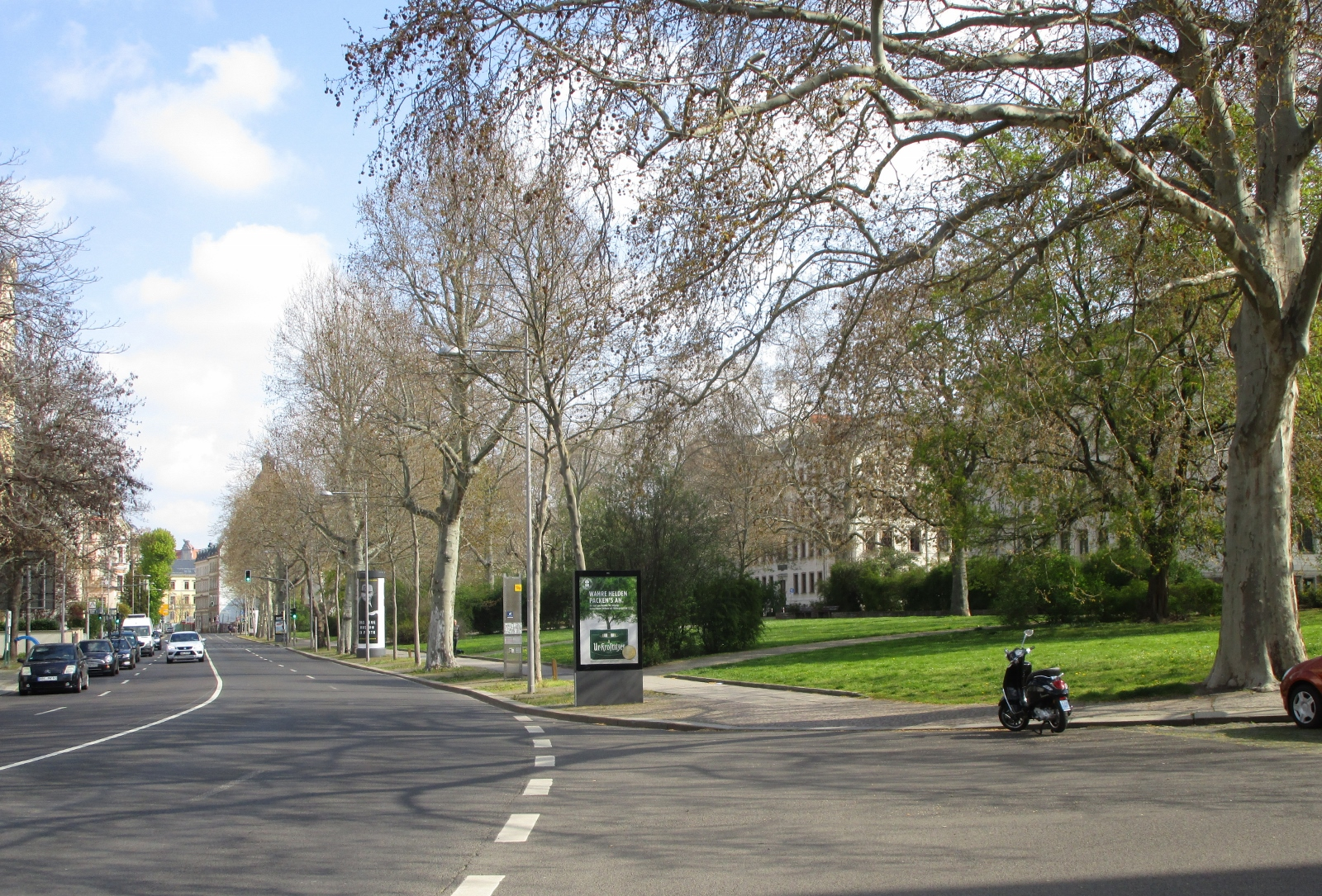
Floßplatz (2021)

Faradaystrasse – in Möckern. Named in 1950 after the chemist and physicist Michael Faraday. Today's street was previously referred to by two names: first as Carolastrasse and extended Carolastrasse and from 1905 Königin-Carola-Strasse and Mecklenburgstrasse.

Ferdinand-Lassalle-Strasse – in Zentrum-West, on the edge of the Bachviertel, named in 1947 after the German writer and social politician Ferdinand Lassalle. From 1884 to 1947 it was named Bismarckstrasse after the first Reich Chancellor Otto von Bismarck.

Feuerbachstrasse – in the Waldstraßenviertel, named in 1947 after the German philosopher Ludwig Feuerbach. From 1884 to 1947 it was called Sedanstrasse after the Battle of Sedan on 1 September 1870.

Floßplatz – between the Musikviertel and Südvorstadt, named in 1873 after its historical function as a storage and trading place for firewood and timber from the 17th to the 19th century for the city of Leipzig. Floss means in English raft. In 1873, the square was converted into a park. Previously, the square had been called Am Floßplatz since 1839.

Friedrich-Bosse-Strasse – in Möckern and Wahren. 1966 named after Friedrich Bosse (1848-1909); Co-founder and chairman of the Arbeiterfortbildungsverein (Workers' Training Association) in Leipzig, founded in 1878. Previously, the street was called Fuchs-Nordhoff-Strasse and Königstrasse.

Funkenburgstrasse – in the Waldstraßenviertel, named in 1888 after the folwark Grosse Funkenburg, which was located on this site.

== G ==
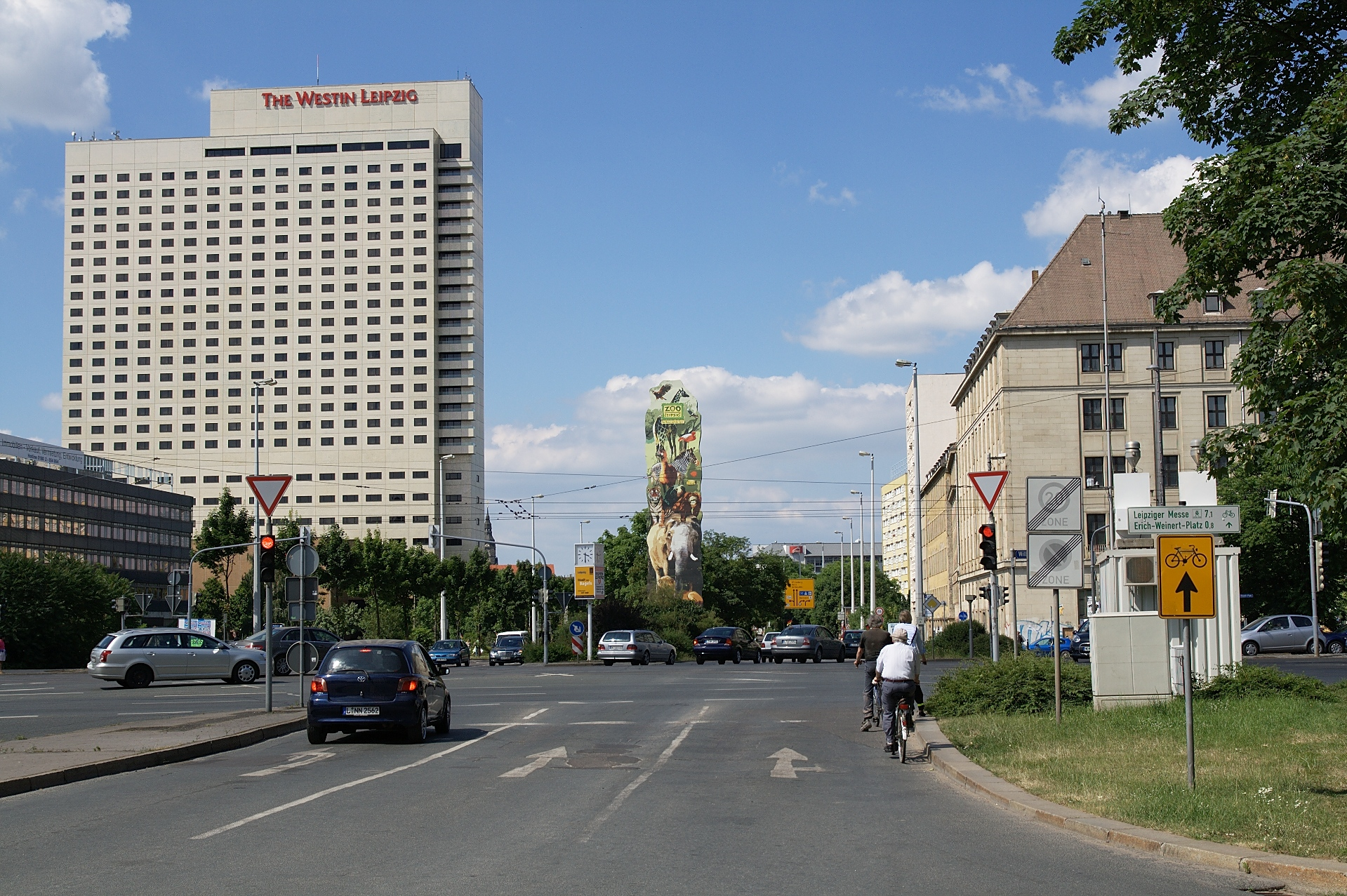
View of Gerberstrasse with Hotel "The Westin Leipzig" (2010)

Georgiring – northeastern part of the inner city ring road from Augustusplatz to Willy-Brandt-Platz, named after the mayor of Leipzig Otto Georgi (1831–1918), previously Bahnhofstrasse between 1839 and 1909.

Georg-Schumann-Strasse – in the localities of Zentrum-Nord, Gohlis-Süd and Möckern. Named in 1945 after the communist and resistance fighter Georg Schumann. In the past, this street was called Hallische Strasse or Hallesche Strasse, depending on the period. Laid out in 1818 as Hallesche Strasse (coll. often only as "Die Chaussee").

Georg-Schwarz-Strasse – in Altlindenau and Leutzsch, named in 1945 after the resistance fighter Georg Schwarz, he lived here in house no. 24. Earlier names of the street or its parts were Hauptstrasse, Friedrich-Ebert-Strasse, Leutzscher Strasse, Leutzscher Weg, Barnecker Strasse, Gundorfer Strasse and Schlageterstrasse.

Gerberstrasse - main road in the Nordvorstadt. Its name goes back to the former tanners' quarter. As part of the Via Imperii, the Gerberstrasse, which was located in front of the Halle gate, was paved early on and was therefore called Hallischer Steinweg (Halle stoneway).

Goerdelerring – northwestern part of the inner city ring road, named after the mayor of Leipzig, Carl Goerdeler, since 1992. Originally, the sections south and north of the junction of the Ranstädter Steinweg with Fleischerplatz and Schulplatz were called differently. In 1945, the squares were merged as Friedrich-Engels-Platz, named after the German philosopher Friedrich Engels.

Gohliser Strasse – in the localities of Zentrum-Nord and Gohlis-Süd, named after the old village of Gohlis. From 1887 onwards, the name initially only referred to the road from Leipzig in the direction of Gohlis, and from 1901 also to the former Leipziger Strasse in Gohlis.

Gottschedstrasse - in Zentrum-West. The residential street is named after the writer, literary and theater theorist Johann Christoph Gottsched (1700–1766).

Goyastrasse – in the Waldstraßenviertel. Named in 1950 after Francisco de Goya, Spanish painter. Previously, it was named Kolmarer Strasse from 1936.

Grimmaischer Steinweg - runs in the locality of Zentrum-Ost in an east-west direction and connects Johannisplatz with Augustusplatz. In the late Middle Ages, the path between the Grimma gate and the purlieu was paved with stone paving, which led to the name Grimmaischer Steinweg (Grimma stoneway).

Grimmaische Strasse – pedestrian street in the city centre. Named after the Grimma Gate. The former Grimmaische Gasse connected the Markt with the city gate in the direction of Grimma. It was thus part of the Via Regia. Until 1951, the tram ran through Grimmaische Strasse.

== H ==
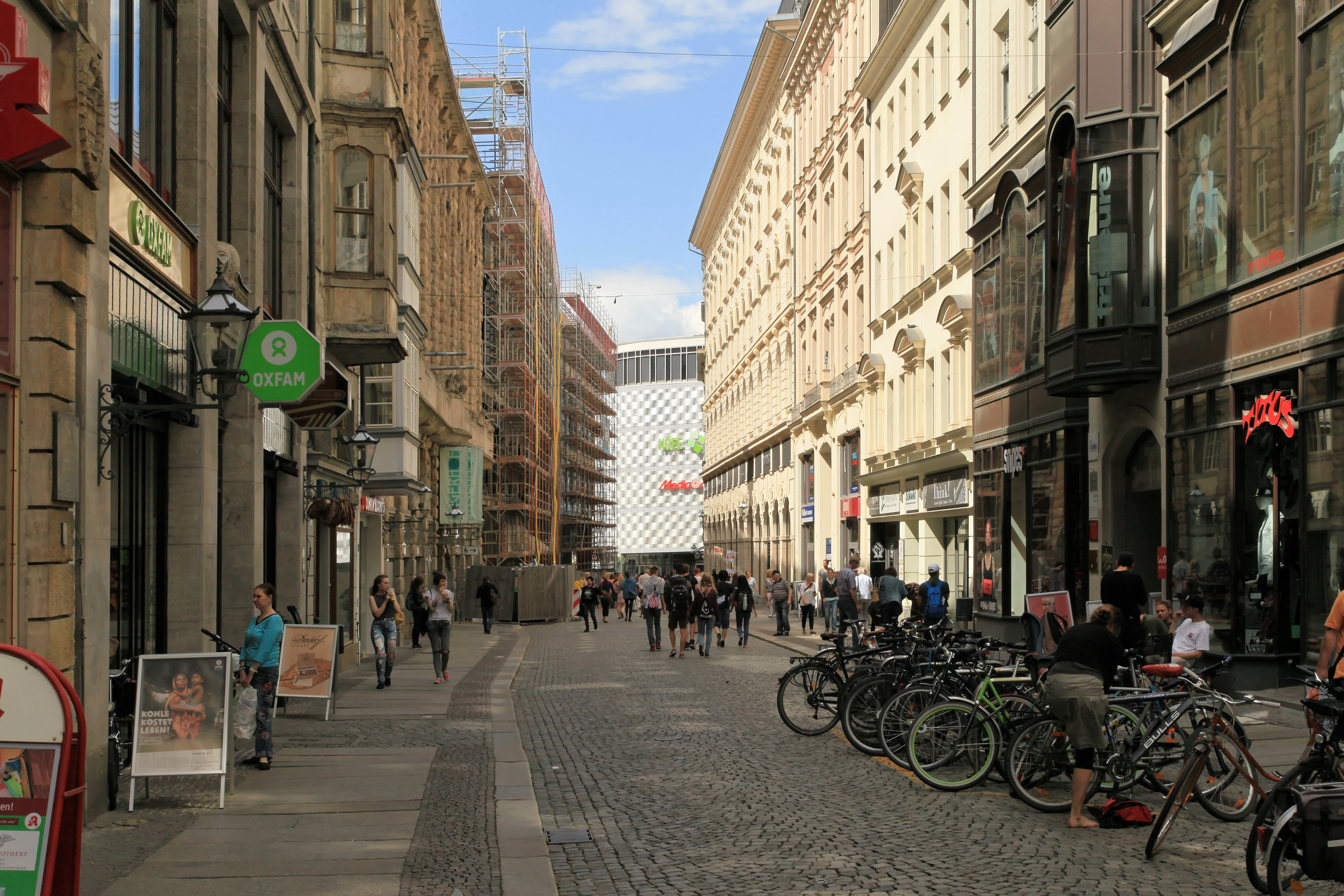
Hainstrasse (2015)

Hainstrasse – in the city centre. First mentioned in 1390 as plata Ranstetensis, since the 15th century Hainstrasse or Hagenstrasse, Heunstrasse or Hoynstrasse. The Hainstrasse was for a time part of the Via Imperii.

Hans-Oster-Strasse – in Gohlis. Named after the resistance fighter Hans Oster. Before that, since 1904 Treitschkestrasse and from 1945 Jonny-Schehr-Strasse.

Harkortstrasse - main road in Zentrum Süd. It leads from the inner city ring road in a southerly direction to Wundtstrasse. The street is named after the entrepreneur and railway pioneer Gustav Harkort (1795–1865).

== J ==
Jahnallee – in the Waldstraßenviertel. Historic highway from Leipzig to the west, part of the Via Regia, main exit route of the French troops after the Battle of the Nations. Earlier names were Frankfurter Strasse, in 1950 Stalinallee; together with the Ranstädter Steinweg, from 1951 Straße der III Weltfestspiele and from 1956 to 1991 Friedrich-Ludwig-Jahn-Allee.

Johannisplatz - square in Zentrum-Südost. Its name goes back to the St. John's Church, which stood here and was finally blown up and removed in 1963.

== K ==
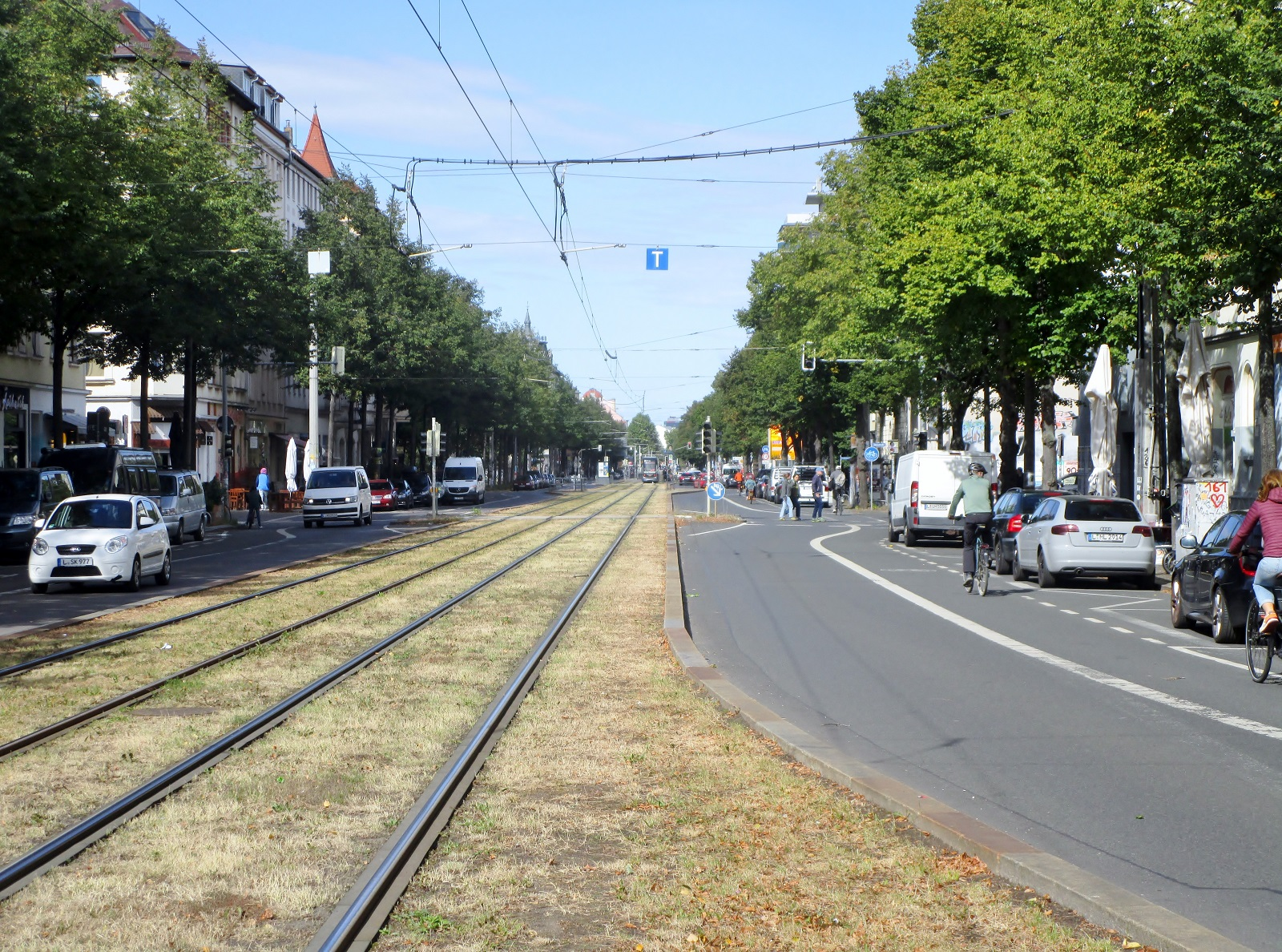
Karl-Liebknecht-Strasse (2024)

Karl-Heine-Strasse – in Lindenau and Plagwitz, it partly forms the border between the two localities. The section between the Plagwitz Bridge and Zschochersche Strasse was initially called Leipziger Allee and Leipziger Strasse. In the last quarter of the 19th century, it was renamed Carl-Heine-Strasse after the Leipzig lawyer and entrepreneur Carl Heine. On 9 December 1891, it was decided to add Albertstrasse and part of Lindenauer Eisenbahnstrasse to Karl-Heine-Strasse from 1893.

Karl-Liebknecht-Strasse – in the localities of Zentrum-Süd, Südvorstadt and Connewitz.The section of road north of the Südplatz was part of the Via Imperii and was called Connewitzer Chaussee until 1839, then Zeitzer Strasse until 1933. The rectilinear part from Südplatz to Connewitzer Kreuz, laid out in the middle of the 19th century, was called Südstrasse from 1874 to 1933. Both parts were named Adolf-Hitler-Straße together in 1933 and in 1945 after the Leipzig KPD co-founder Karl Liebknecht, who lived in the house at Karl-Liebknecht-Straße 69.

Karl-Tauchnitz-Strasse – in the Musikviertel, named in 1885 after the Leipzig publisher and important benefactor Carl Christian Philipp Tauchnitz.

Katharinenstrasse - in the city centre. It connects the Markt and the Brühl. The name goes back to a former chapel at the northern end of the street which was mentioned 1240.

Käthe-Kollwitz-Strasse – in the Bachviertel. The street is named after the graphic artist Käthe Kollwitz on the instructions of the Free State of Saxony in July 1945. Previous names were Helfferichstrasse as well as sections of Richard-Lipinski-Strasse, Mackensenstrasse, Promenadenstrasse and Plagwitzer Strasse.

Kickerlingsberg – in the locakities of Zentrum-Nord and Gohlis-Süd: Field name, named after the Kickerlingsberg, formerly also Gickerlingsberg, a hill on the edge of the Rosental, where small mosquitoes (popularly known as Kickerlinge) occurred due to the proximity of the river Pleiße. The street was named that way in 1904.

Kochstrasse – in the Südvorstadt and Connewitz, named after Carl Wilhelm Otto Koch, who was mayor of Leipzig from 1849 to 1876. The street was part of the Via Imperii. The section in the Südvorstadt was previously called Connewitzer Chaussee and Connewitzer Strasse, the one in Connewitz Leipziger Strasse.

Körnerstrasse – in Zentrum-Süd and Südvorstadt, it forms part of the border between the two localities and was named after the poet Theodor Körner.

Kupfergasse – in the city centre. From the 15th to the 18th century, copper was traded from what was then Upper Hungary (today's Slovakia) via Leipzig to Antwerp. In the alley, the necessary copper scales were located in the armoury, which later became the first Gewandhaus. Before 1903, the alley was called Kupfergäßchen.

Kurt-Eisner-Strasse – in the Südvorstadt. It is named after the journalist and writer Kurt Eisner, who was also briefly Prime Minister of the Bavarian Soviet Republic.

== L ==
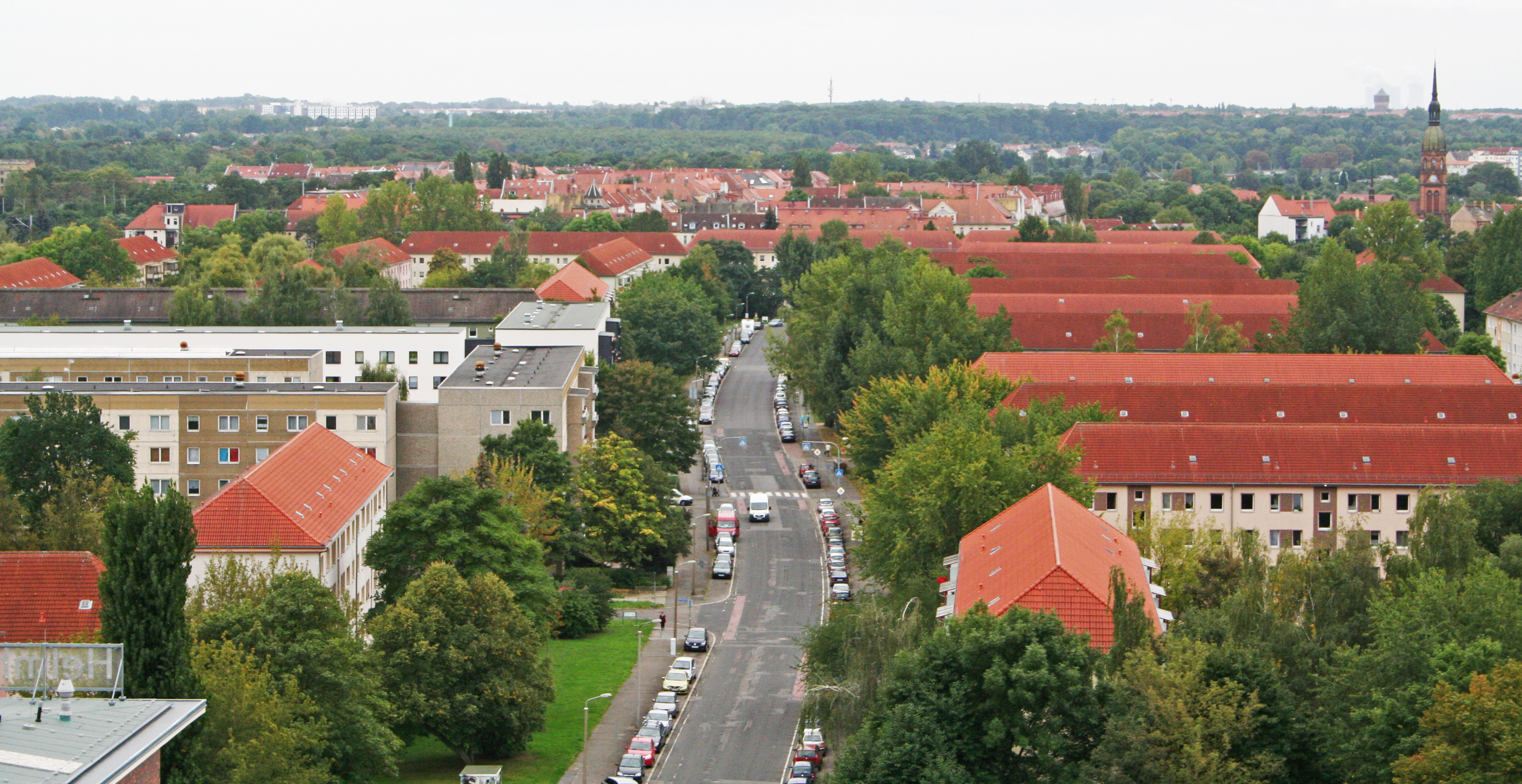
View from the tower of the UFZ Leipzig to Leonhard-Frank-Strasse (2017)

Lindenauer Markt - in Lindenau, incorporated into Leipzig in 1891. During its history, the square bore also the names Teichplatz (until 1869), Markt (1869–1907) and Wilhelm-Liebknecht-Platz (1947–1992) after the social democratic politician Wilhelm Liebknecht.

Linkelstrasse – in the locality of Wahren. Formerly colloquially Pflaumenallee (Plum trees avenue). From 1894 it was called Bahnhofstraße, as it leads to Leipzig-Wahren station, and was renamed Linkelstraße in 1928. "Linkel" is the popular name for the Lindenthal locality.

Liviaplatz - living street square in the Waldstraßenviertel. 2024 named after the singer Livia Frege (1818–1891), after this designation for the address-free street square had been used colloquially for some time.

== M ==
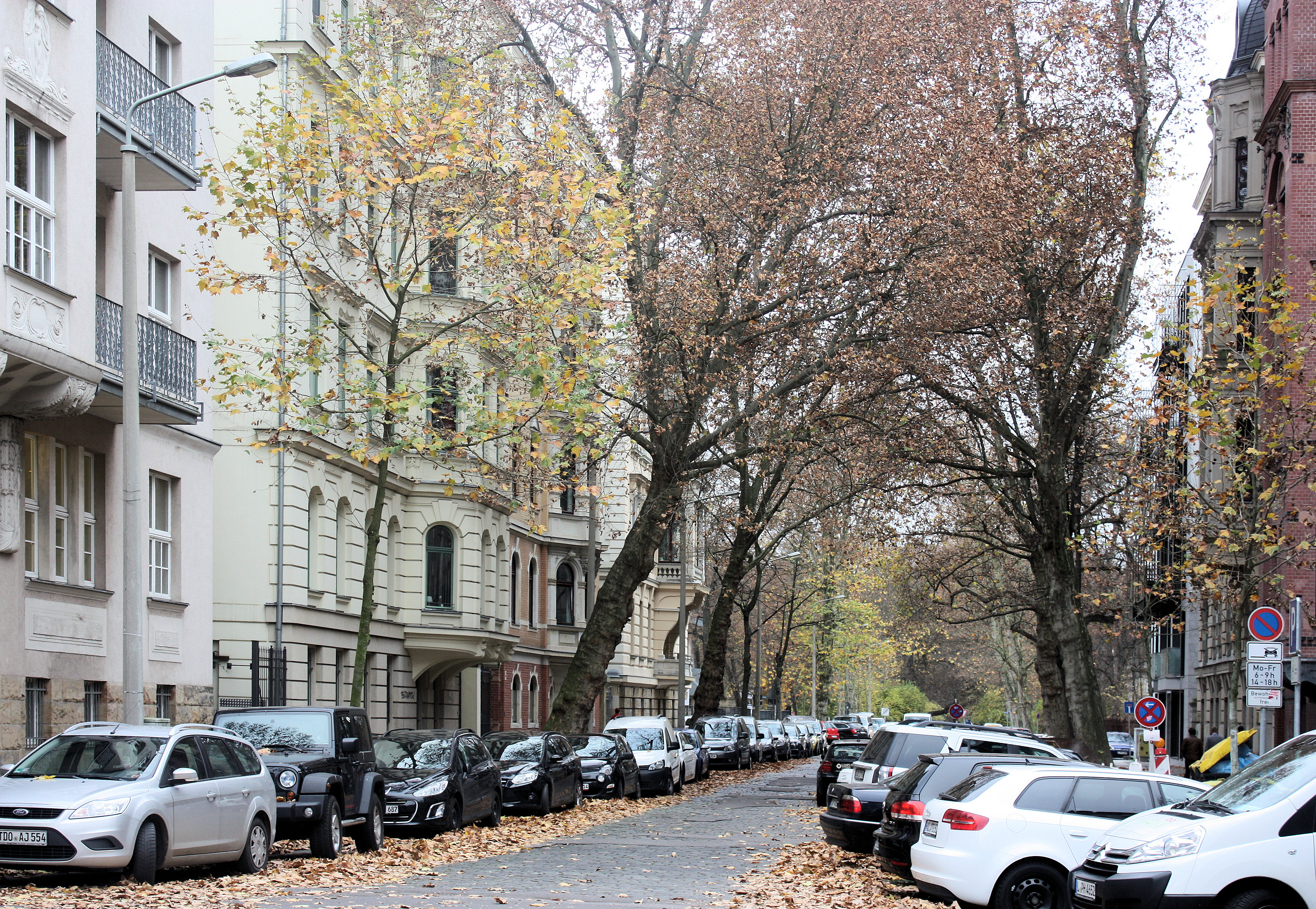
Mozartstrasse, west end of the street (2015)

Markt - square in the city center. It has existed since the Middle Ages and is considered the center of the city.

Martin-Luther-Ring – southwestern part of the inner city ring road, named in 1933 after the reformer Martin Luther (1483–1546), who took part in the Leipzig Debate in 1519 at the Pleissenburg. Previous names were An der Pleiße, Obstmarkt and from 1898 Rathausring.

Max-Liebermann-Strasse – in the localities Gohlis and Möckern: The street was named in 1950 after the painter Max Liebermann, previously it was named Danziger Strasse from 1939 and in a section as Tauchaer Weg.

Menckestrasse – in Gohlis. In 1720, the village of Gohlis was owned by the Mencke family of lawyers and scholars. In 1900, the most important street in the old Gohlis was named after the Menckes. Before that, it was known as Dorfstrasse or Hauptstrasse (village street or main street).

Mozartstrasse - residential street in the Musikviertel, named after the composer Wolfgang Amadeus Mozart (1756–1791).

== N ==
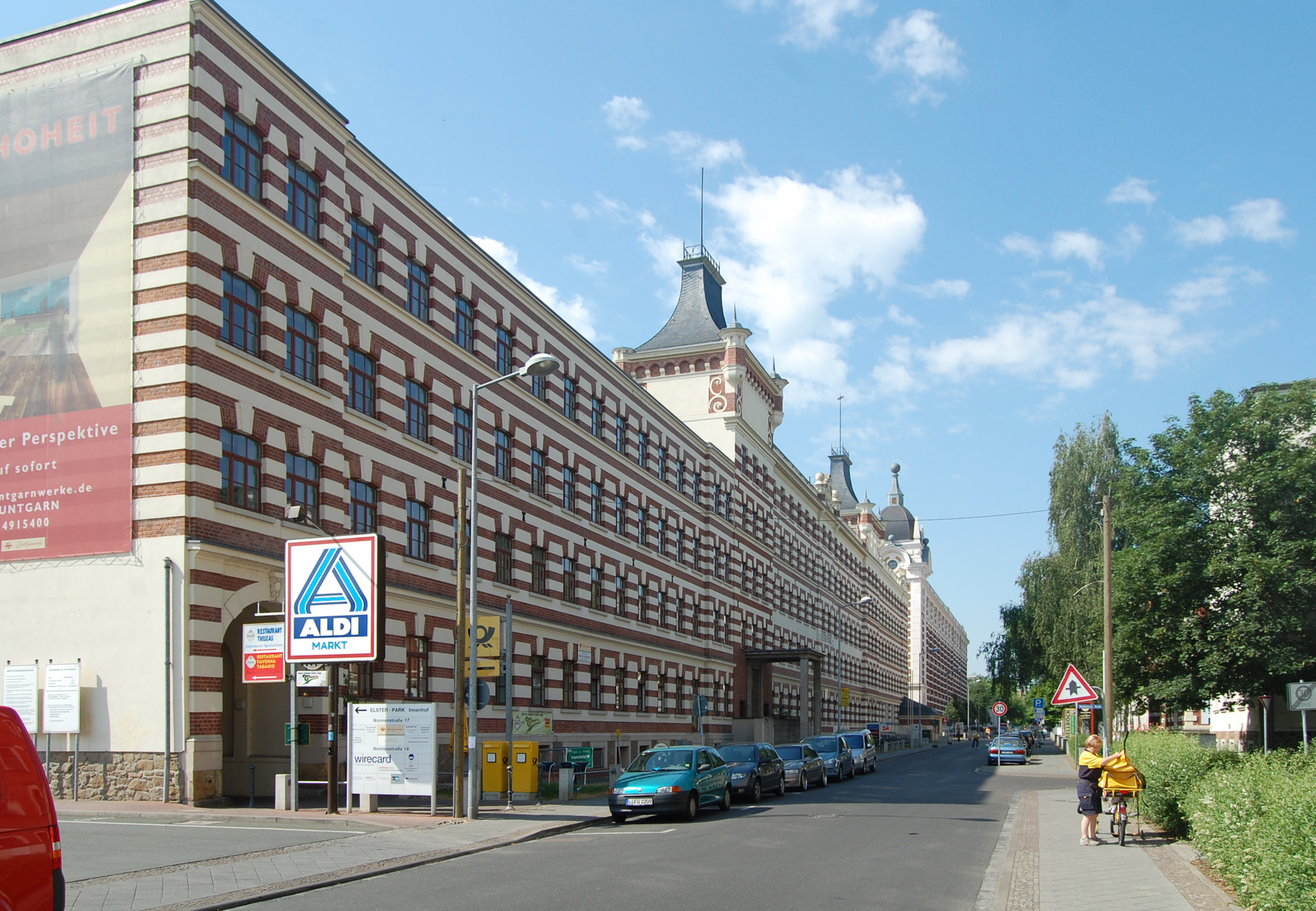
Nonnenstrasse in Plagwitz (2008)

Naschmarkt - a square in the city centre, located behind the Old Town Hall between Grimmaische Strasse and Salzgäßchen.

Naundörfchen – between city centre and Waldstraßenviertel. The street was named in 1947 after the settlement located there since the 11th century, previously it was called Schottengäßchen.

Nikolaikirchhof (in English: St. Nicholas Church Square) is a square in the city center. The St. Nicholas Church (German: Nikolaikirche) stands on it.

Nikolaistrasse - street in the center, which has been designated as a pedestrian zone since 1998. The name is due to the St. Nicholas Church, which is located beside the street.

Nonnenstrasse - in Plagwitz, connects Karl-Heine-Strasse and Erich-Zeigner-Allee. The name refers to the Georgen nunnery, which also gave the name to the nearby forest in Schleußig "Die Nonne" (The nun).

== O ==
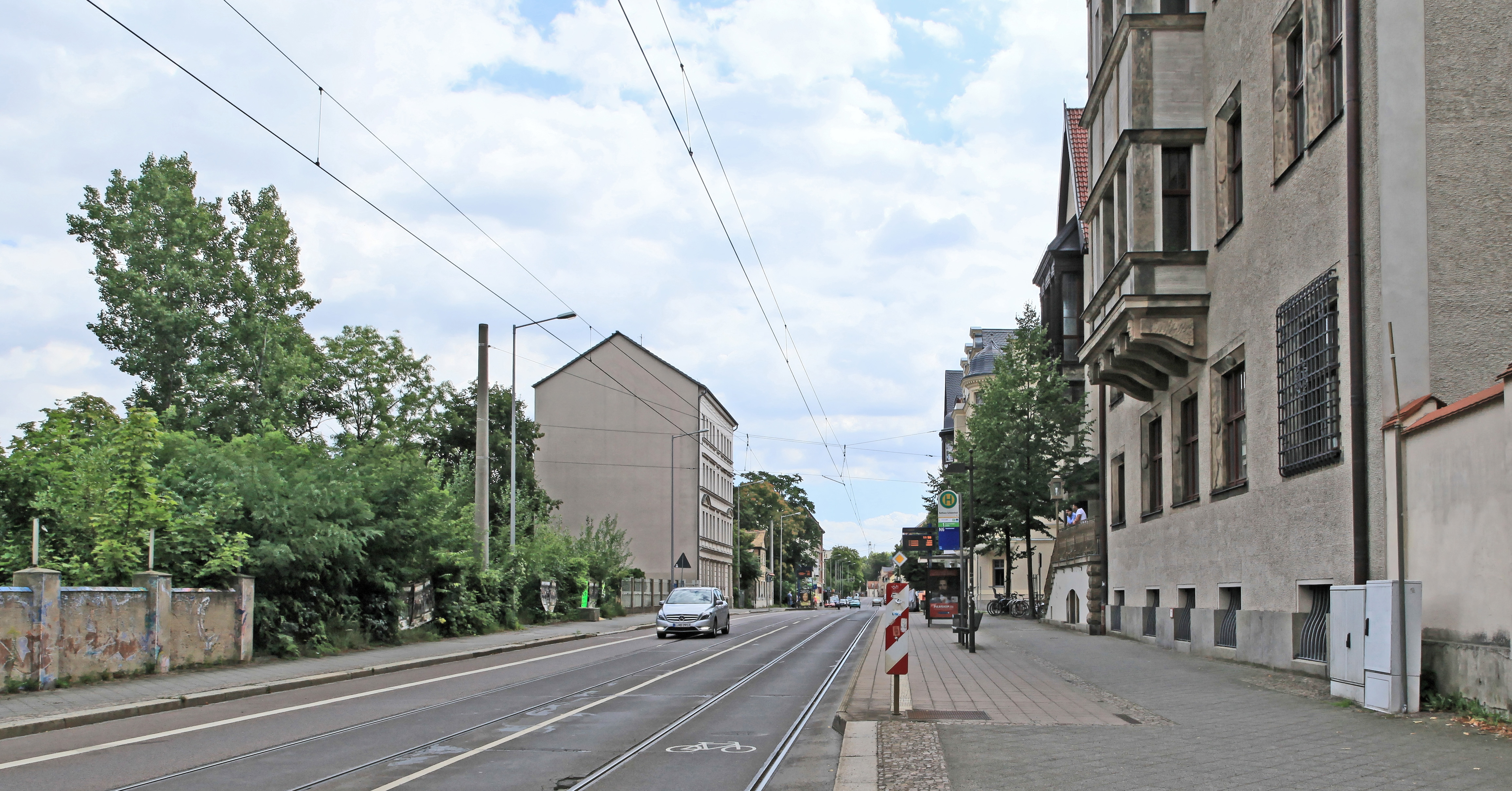
Ossietzkystrasse (2016)

Olbrichtstrasse – in the localities Möckern and Gohlis. Named in 1947 after General Friedrich Olbricht, before that it had been called Heerstrasse since 1897.

Ossietzkystrasse - main road connecting the localities Schönefeld and Mockau in the borough northeast. It is named after the journalist, writer and Nobel Peace Prize winner Carl von Ossietzky (1889–1938).

Oststrasse (East Street) – main road in the localities of Reudnitz-Thonberg, Anger-Crottendorf and Stötteritz, which got its name because of its eastern location to the city centre. It was formed between 1904 and 1913 by the gradual merging of Oststrasse, Anger-Crottendorf-Weg and Stötteritzer Weg.

== P ==
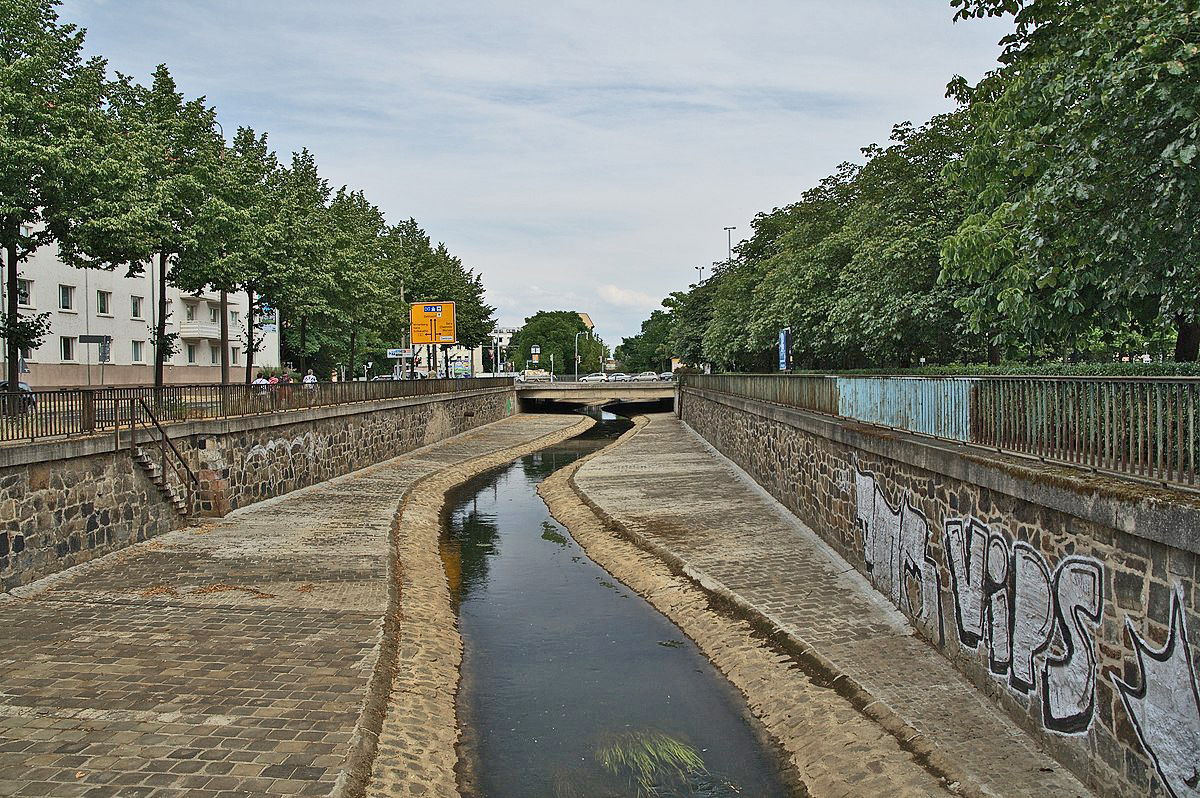
Parthenstrasse runs parallel to Parthe at the top left (2016)

Parthenstrasse - in the Nordvorstadt near the Leipzig Zoo. The street runs along the small river Parthe, after which it is named.

Permoserstrasse - begins in the district of Schönefeld-Ost and leads to the eastern city limits, where there is an entrance to the A 14 motorway. It is named after the Baroque sculptor Balthasar Permoser (1651–1732).

Peterssteinweg - was historically the extension of Petersstrasse outside the Peter Gate to the south. The extension of Peterssteinweg, in turn, even further south is Karl-Liebknecht-Strasse. The German name Steinweg means stoneway.

Petersstrasse – pedestrian street in the city centre. Petersstrasse was the main street of the Petersviertel. The name Petersstrasse has been used in the council records since 1420 and refers to the old St. Peter's Church, which was located nearby at the time, and led to Leipzig's southern city gate, the Peterstor. The street existed before the city was founded in 1165 and was part of the Via Imperii.

Pfaffendorfer Strasse – named in 1866 after the former folwark Pfaffendorf, which was located on the site of today's zoo. From 1951 to 31 December 1991, the street was renamed Dr.-Kurt-Fischer-Strasse.

Prager Strasse – in the localities of Zentrum-Südost, Reudnitz-Thonberg, Stötteritz, Probstheida and Meusdorf. The formerly three-part street was called Hospitalstrasse from Johannisplatz to Ostplatz (named after the former Johannishospital), from Ostplatz to Friedhofsweg it was called Reitzenhainer Strasse (named after the former village of Reitzenhain). The remaining part was called Preußenstrasse. The entire street was renamed Leninstrasse in 1950. On 1 January 1992, the street was given its current name after the Czech capital Prague.

== R ==
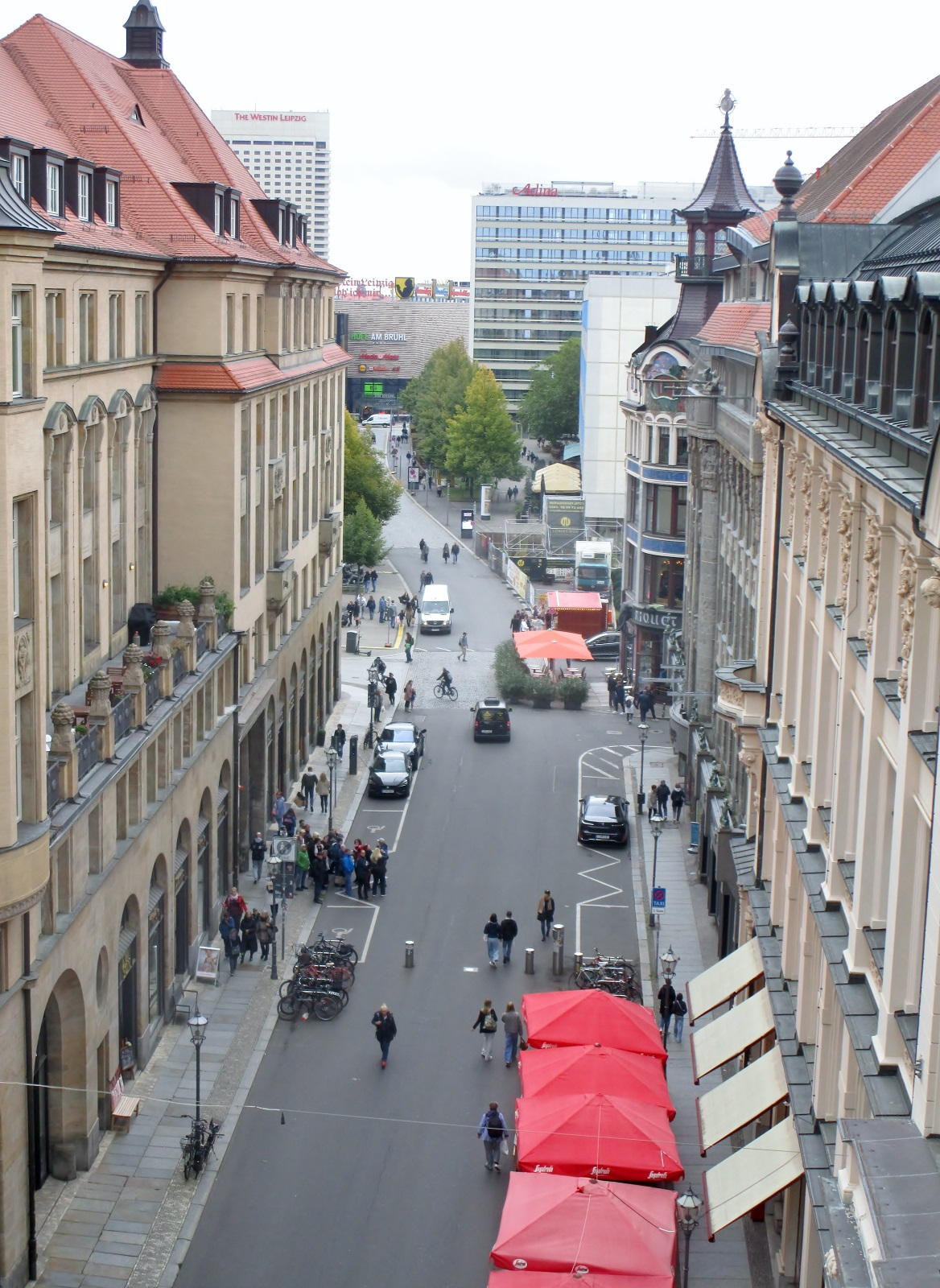
Reichsstrasse from above (2024)

Ranstädter Steinweg - just outside the inner city ring road on the edge of the Waldstraßenviertel. Historically, it was part of the road leading west to Ranstädt (today Altranstädt). The Ranstädt Gate, where the Ranstädter Steinweg began (today Richard-Wagner-Platz), was one of the four Leipzig city gates. The German name Steinweg means stoneway.

Reichsstrasse - residential street in the locality Zentrum (city centre). It runs in a slightly curved north-south direction between Brühl and Grimmaische Strasse. The eponymous old trade route Via Imperii (Imperial Road) once ran through it.

Richard-Lehmann-Strasse - main road in the borough south in the localities Südvorstadt, Connewitz, Zentrum-Südost, Marienbrunn. Laid out from 1882, it was initially called Kaiserin-Augusta-Strasse after the wife of Emperor Wilhelm I. On August 1, 1945, the street was renamed and named after the resistance fighter, Richard Lehmann.

Richard-Wagner-Platz – in the northwest corner of the Inner City Ring Road (Leipzig). It was the market of the Slavic settlement of Lipsk and as such is the oldest square in Leipzig. It was originally the intersection of the Via Regia and the Via Imperii. The square was named in 1913 after the composer Richard Wagner, who was born in the immediate vicinity.

Richard-Wagner-Strasse - residential street with starting point Richard-Wagner-Platz, partly bicycle street, on the edge of the locality Zentrum (city center). Like Richard-Wagner-Platz, it was named after the composer Richard Wagner (1813–1883), whose birthplace on Brühl had been located nearby until 1886.

Roßplatz – southeastern section of the inner city ring road, named after the horse markets that used to take place here. In 2024, the section with the Mägdebrunnen was renamed Hinrich-Lehmann-Grube-Platz, after Leipzig's first post-reunification mayor Hinrich Lehmann-Grube.

== S ==
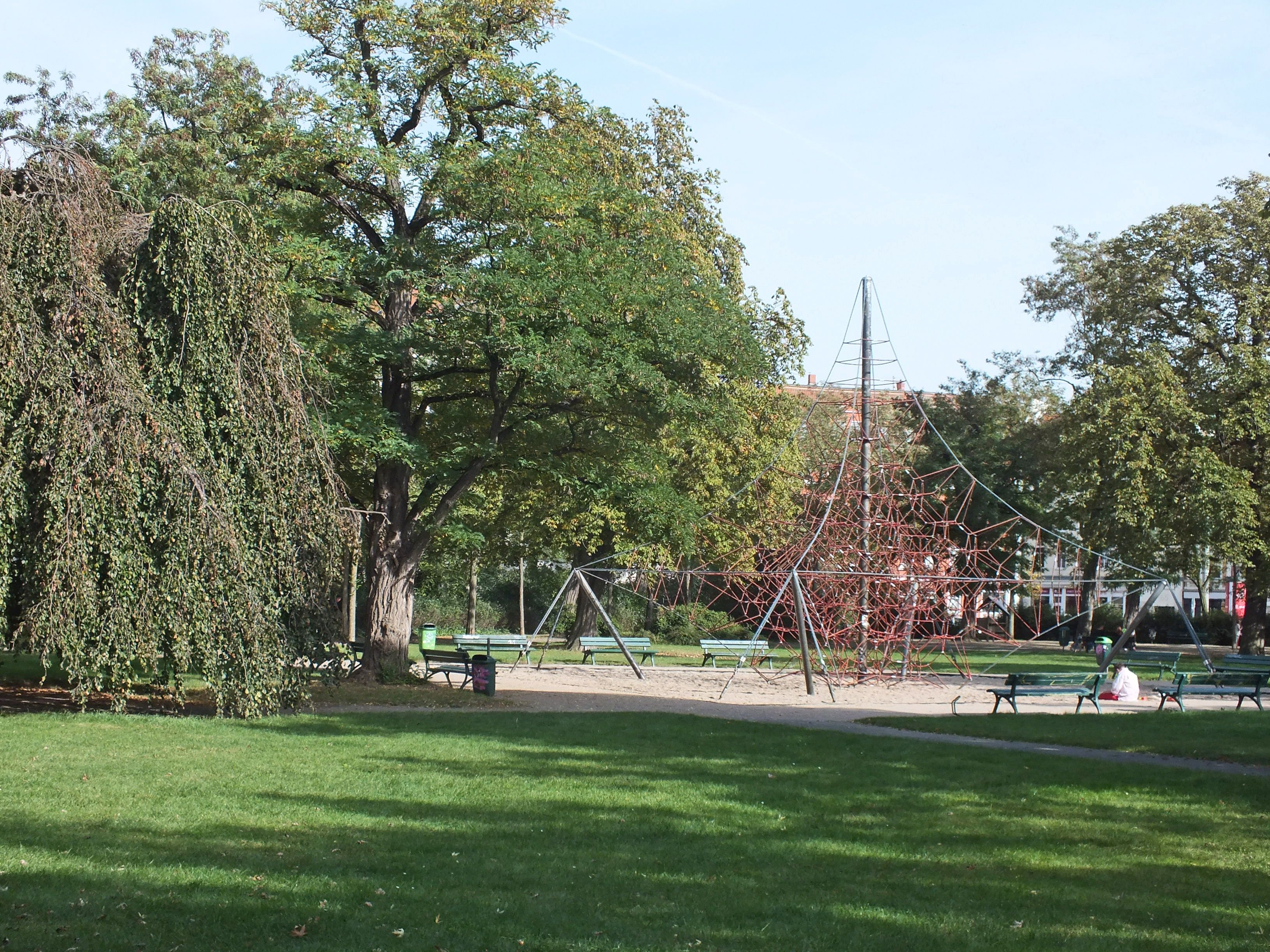
Middle section of Schwartzeplatz in Kleinzschocher (2023)

Sachsenplatz (The Saxon's square) - former square in the Zentrum locality, which bore this name from 1969 to 2002. It was built over at the beginning of the 21st century with the Museumsquartier Leipzig.

Schillerstrasse - residential street in the Zentrum locality, named after the poet Friedrich Schiller (1759–1805).

Schwägrichenstrasse – in the Musikviertel, named in 1889 after the Leipzig botanist Christian Friedrich Schwägrichen (1775–1853). A section was previously called Wächterstrasse.

Schwartzeplatz Schwartze square) - a square as green space and playground in Kleinzschocher. Like the neighboring street of the same name, it is named after Heinrich Engelbrecht Schwartze (1704–1767), who was a pastor in Großzschocher from 1733.

Seelenbinderstrasse – in Möckern, laid out in the 1870s. Today named after the wrestler and communist Werner Seelenbinder. Formerly called Braustrasse after the brewery founded in 1867 by Eduard Rohland on the site of today's corner of Seelenbinder-/Georg-Schumann-Strasse), from 1905 Wedellstrasse and from 1912 Krosigkstrasse.

Strasse des 18. Oktober (Street of the 18th october) - in Zentrum-Südost and Thonberg. As a continuation of Windmühlenstrasse, it leads from Bayrischer Platz in a south-easterly direction towards the Monument to the Battle of the Nations. Its name commemorates the day of the decisive victory of the Allied troops over Napoleon in the Battle of Leipzig on 18 October 1813.

== T ==
Thomaskirchhof, St. Thomas Church Square, is a square in the city centre. At its centre is the St. Thomas Church.

Tröndlinring – northwestern part of the inner city ring road, named in 1909 after the mayor of Leipzig, Bruno Tröndlin (1835–1908), previously Am Löhrschen Platz.

Tschaikowskistrasse – in the Waldstraßenviertel, named in 1888 as König-Johann-Strasse after John, King of Saxony, who was king in 1854–1873. In 1947 it was renamed Johannstrasse, since 1950 it has borne its current name Tschaikowskistrasse after the Russian composer Pyotr Ilyich Tchaikovsky (1840–1893).

== V ==
Virchowstrasse – in Gohlis. In 1950, the street was named after the doctor Rudolf Virchow (1821–1902). Its previous name was Pariser Strasse in memory of the siege of Paris in the Franco-German War of 1870/71.

== W ==
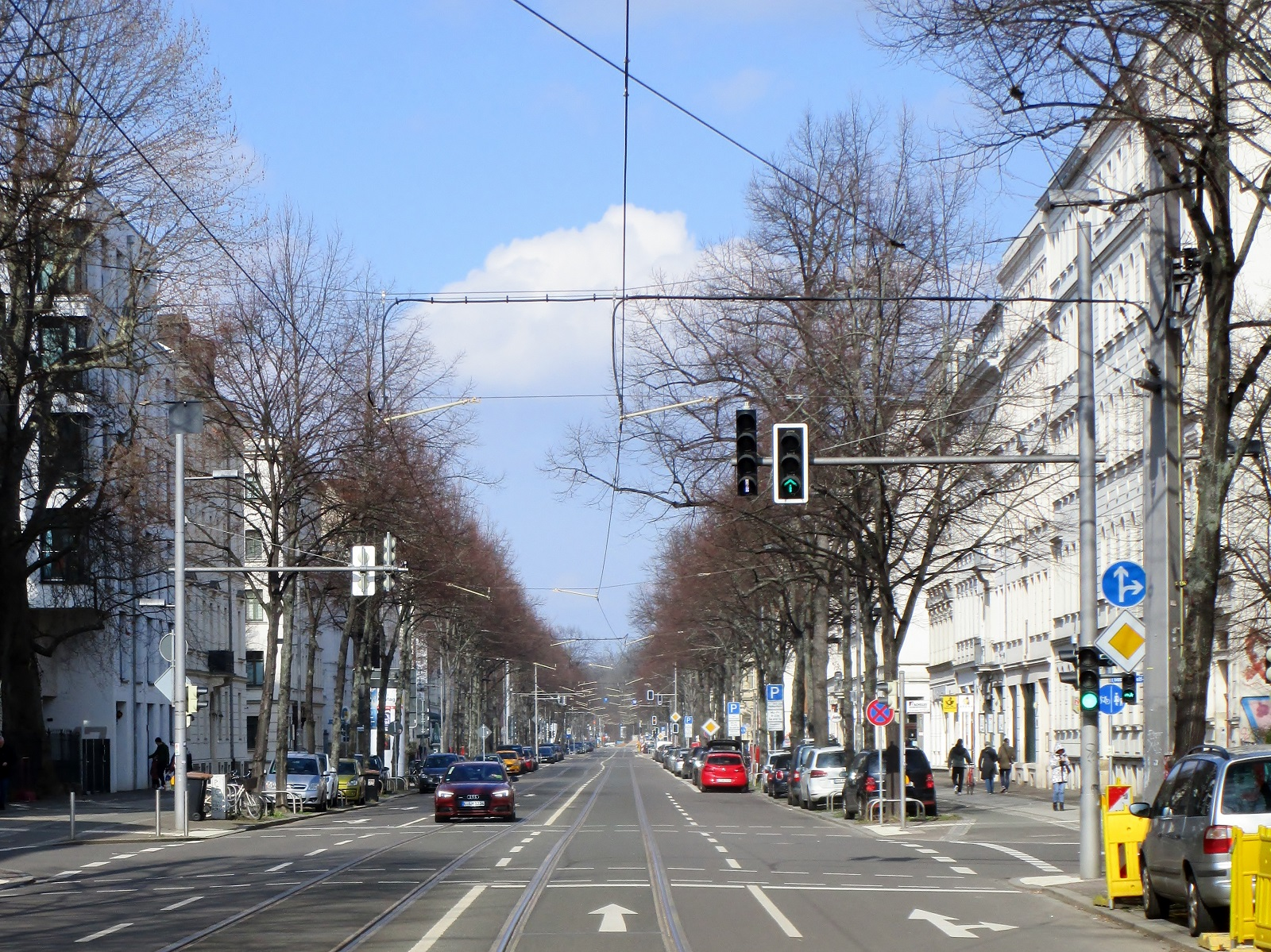
Waldstrasse (2024)

Waldstrasse – in the Waldstraßenviertel. The road leads from Waldplatz as the main road through the Waldstraßenviertel. It was officially named in 1855 after the Rosental city forest. From 1938 to 1945, it bore the name Ludendorffstrasse together with Elsterstrasse.

Wettiner Strasse – in the Waldstraßenviertel, named in 1884 as Wettinerstrasse after the house of Wettin, from which [until 1918] the sovereigns of the city of Leipzig came.

Wilhelm-Leuschner-Platz - square in Zentrum Süd. Built only after the Second World War on a wasteland cleared of rubble, the square forms the transition from the city to the inner Südvorstadt and is located on the southern section of the inner city ring road. It is named after the trade unionist and Social Democratic member of the Reichstag Wilhelm Leuschner (1890–1944), who fought against National Socialism. Previously, part of the square had been called Königsplatz (King's square) since 1839.

Willy-Brandt-Platz – northeastern part of the inner city ring road or forecourt of Leipzig Central Station, named in 1993 after the German politician Willy Brandt. Before that, the originally smaller section of the street was named Blücherplatz (1870–1945), Karl-Legien-Platz (1945–1953, after the German trade unionist Carl Legien) and Platz der Republik (1953–1993).

Windmühlenstrasse – border between the districts of Zentrum-Süd and Zentrum-Südost. The street was named after the windmills on Bayrischer Platz that were destroyed in the Thirty Years' War. It was previously called Grosse Windmühlengasse.

Wundtstrasse - main arterial road in Zentrum-Süd, Südvorstadt, Connewitz and Dölitz-Dösen. It is a four-lane expressway in an embankment from the intersection with Schleußiger Weg and Kurt-Eisner-Strasse and serves as a feeder road to the A38 and A72 motorways. It is named after the physiologist, philosopher and psychologist Wilhelm Wundt (1832–1920), who used to work in Leipzig.

== Z ==
Zöllnerweg - connecting road in Zentrum-Nordwest, which runs slightly winding along the edge of the Rosental. The Zöllnerweg is named after the Leipzig music teacher, composer and choirmaster Carl Friedrich Zöllner (1800–1860).

Zweifelstrasse – in Probstheida. It was named in 1931 after the gynaecologist Paul Zweifel (1848–1927). The houses built on the east side of the street have the odd house numbers 1 to 19, but even house numbers do not exist, because the grounds of the 31st school are located on the west side of the street.

== Literature ==
- Griebsch, Gernot; Klank, Gina (1995). Lexikon Leipziger Straßennamen (in German). Leipzig: Verlag im Wissenschaftszentrum. ISBN 3-930433-09-5.
