= Eisenbahnstrasse, Leipzig =

Street in Leipzig, Germany

Coordinates: 51.34531°N 12.40995°E

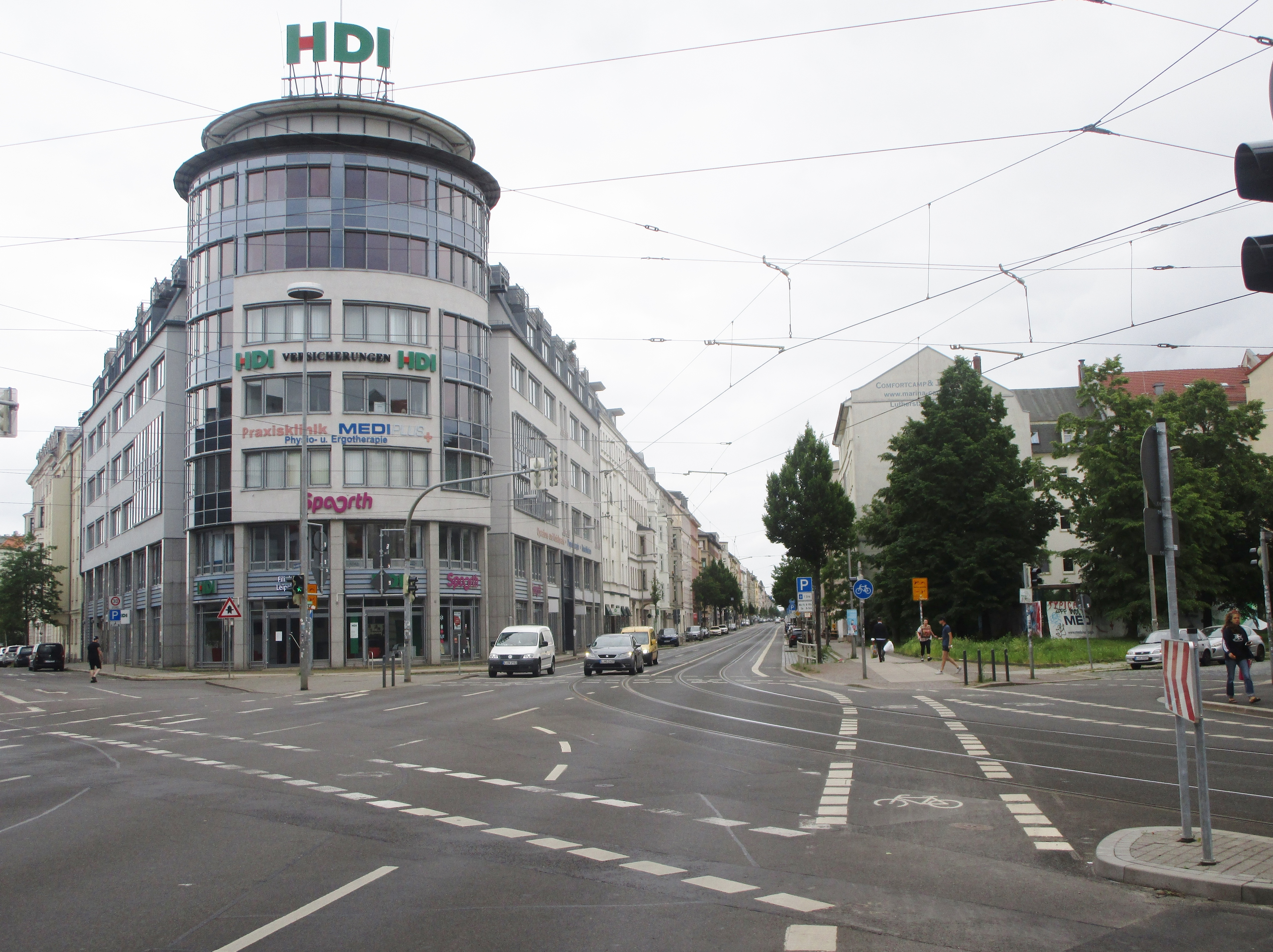
- Beginning at Rosa-Luxemburg-Strasse (2021)
- Interactive map of Eisenbahnstrasse, Leipzig
- Former name: Ernst-Thälmann-Strasse (1945–1991)
- Length: 2,300 m (7,500 ft)
- Location: Leipzig, Germany
- Postal code: 04315
- Nearest metro station: Trams in Leipzig, tram stops Einertstrasse (lines 1, 3, 8), Hermann-Liebmann-/Eisenbahnstrasse (1, 3, 8), Torgauer Platz (3, 8) and Geißlerstrasse, Bülowviertel (line 8)
- East: Wurzner Strasse
- West: Rosa-Luxemburg-Strasse

Construction
- Completion: 1879

Eisenbahnstrasse (in English: Railway Street) is a main street in Leipzig, Germany, which runs through four eastern localities of the city. It owes its name to a former railway line that was laid out in the 19th century. In the meantime, it was called Ernst-Thälmann-Strasse in GDR times.

== Location and course ==
Eisenbahnstraße begins at Friedrich-List-Platz near the main station and runs in a straight line eastwards for about 2.2 km (1.4 mi) to the Leipzig-Sellerhausen stop on the Leipzig–Dresden railway. In doing so, it completely crosses the localities of Neustadt-Neuschönefeld and Volkmarsdorf. In front of the embankment of the former Leipzig Hbf–Leipzig-Connewitz railway line, on which the Parkbogen Ost is currently being built, the right of way and the tram tracks bend southwards onto Annenstrasse. Eisenbahnstrasse continues straight ahead through a culvert in the dam and for about 250 m (820 ft) into the locality of Sellerhausen-Stünz.

About 100 m (330 ft) after the beginning of Eisenbahnstrasse at Jonasstrasse, it crosses the underground Eastern Rietzschke. On Otto-Runki-Platz, the newly built sports pool at Rabet was opened on 11 August 2025, and a district library is planned right next to it. Between the cross streets Neustädter Strasse and Konradstrasse, Eisenbahnstrasse borders on the Rabet district park and the primary school Schule am Rabet.

In the second row behind the residential building at Eisenbahnstrasse 74, the Ost-Passage Theater neighbourhood stage was opened on 9 March 2018.

Along Eisenbahnstrasse are the tram stops Einertstrasse (lines 1, 3, 8), Hermann-Liebmann-/Eisenbahnstrasse (1, 3, 8), Torgauer Platz (3, 8) and Geißlerstrasse, Bülowviertel (line 8).

Views

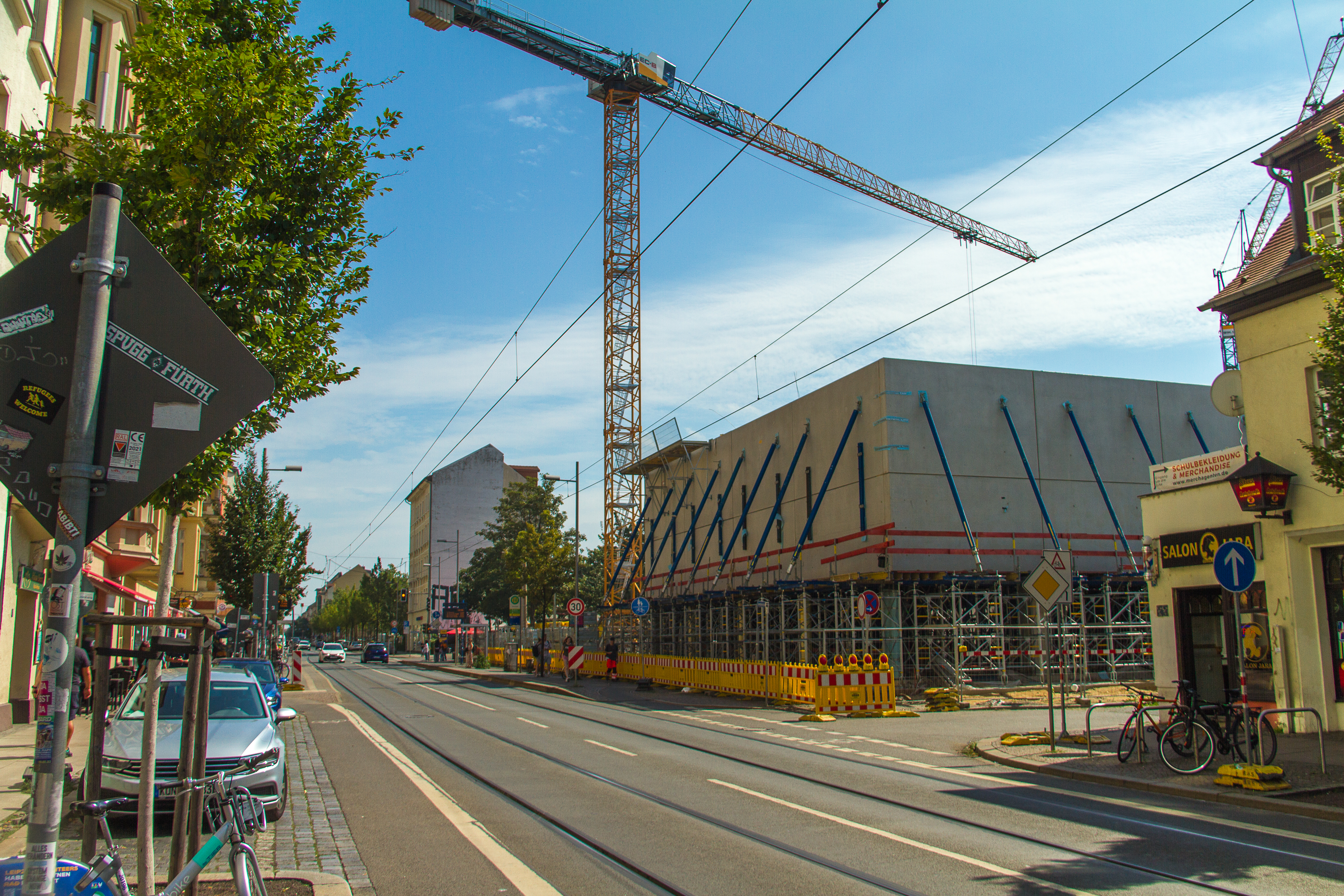
Construction site "Schwimmbad am Rabet" (2023)

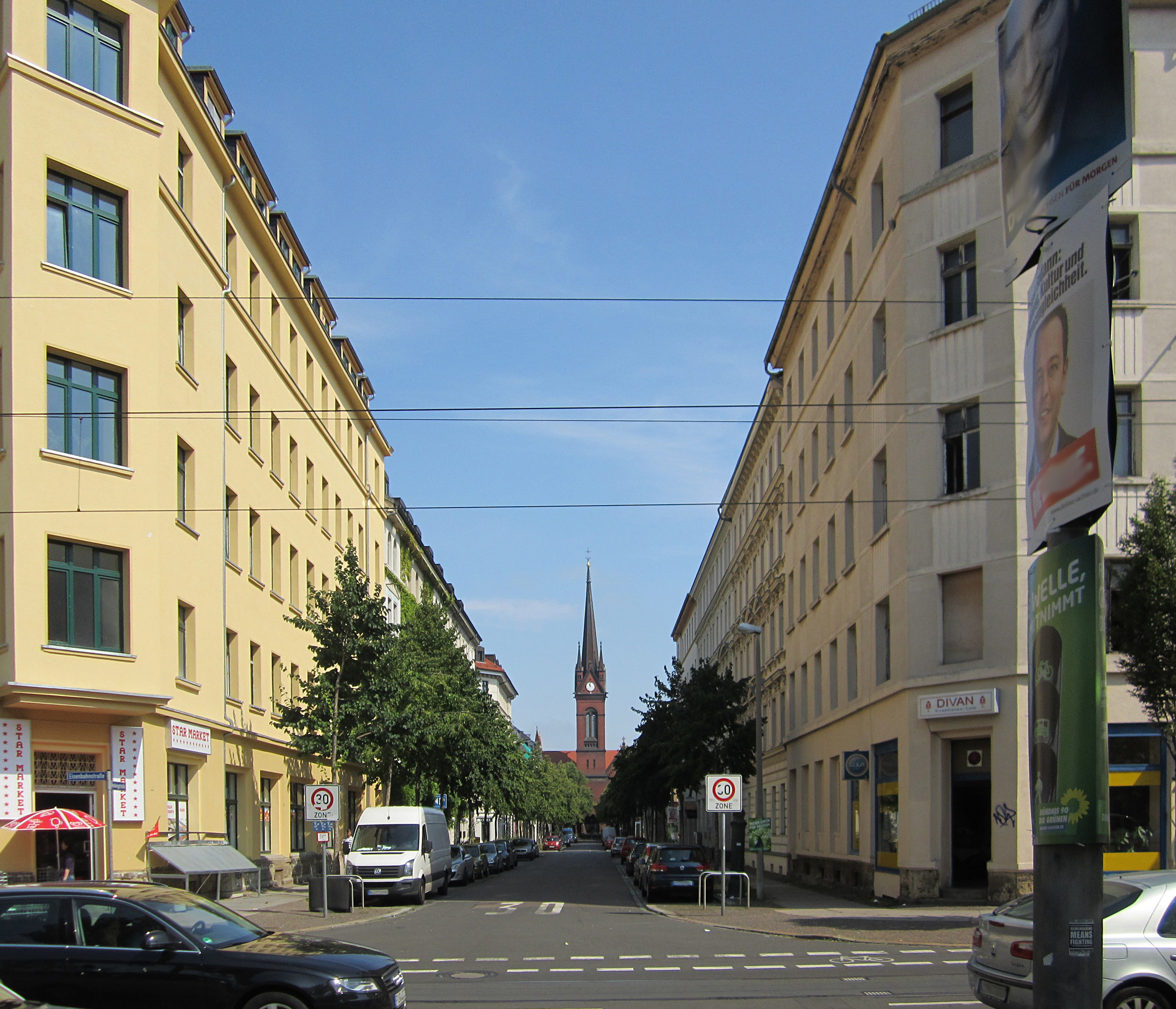
View from Eisenbahnstrasse to the Heilig-Kreuz-Kirche (2014)

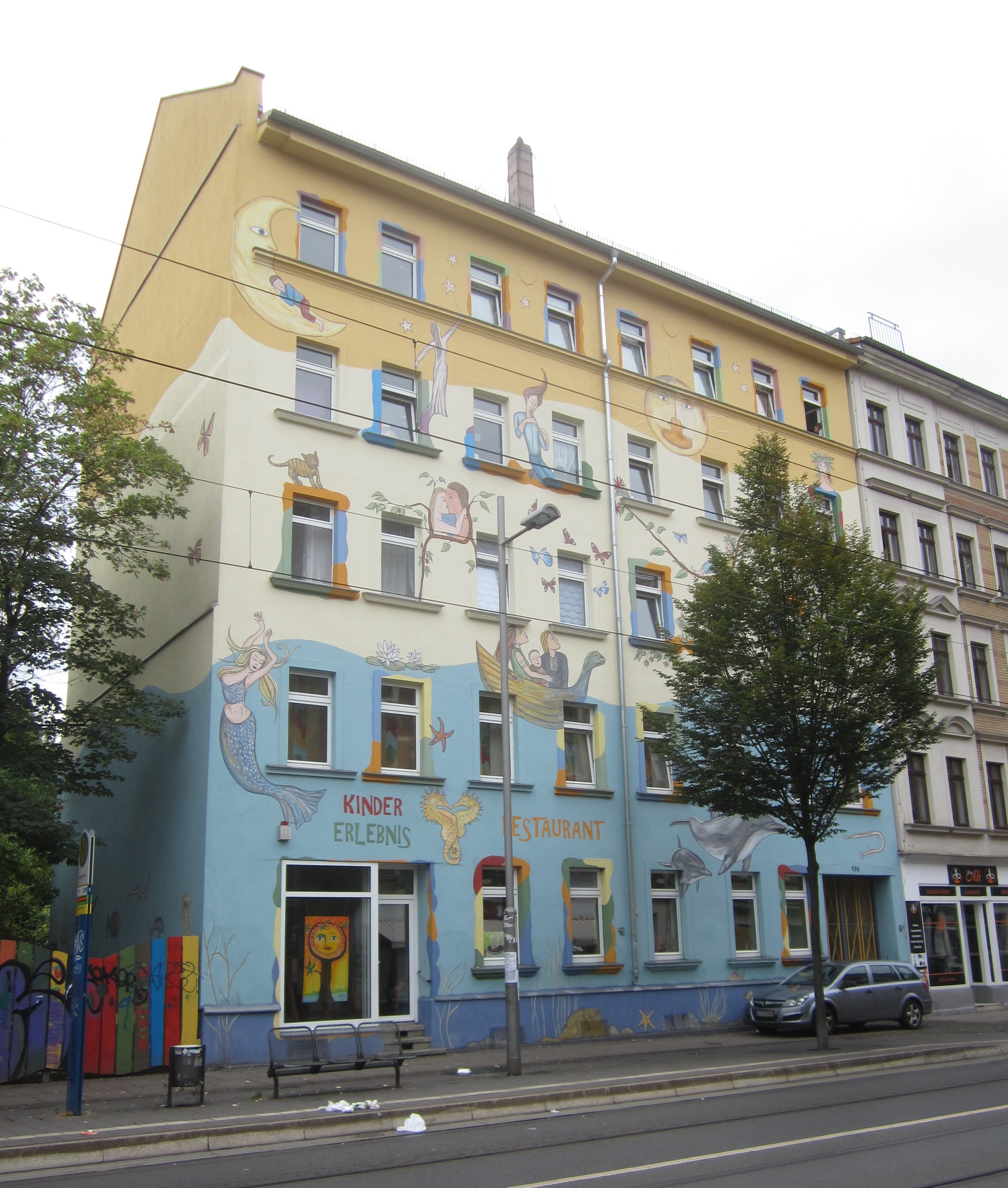
Residential building at the Torgauer Strasse stop (2020)

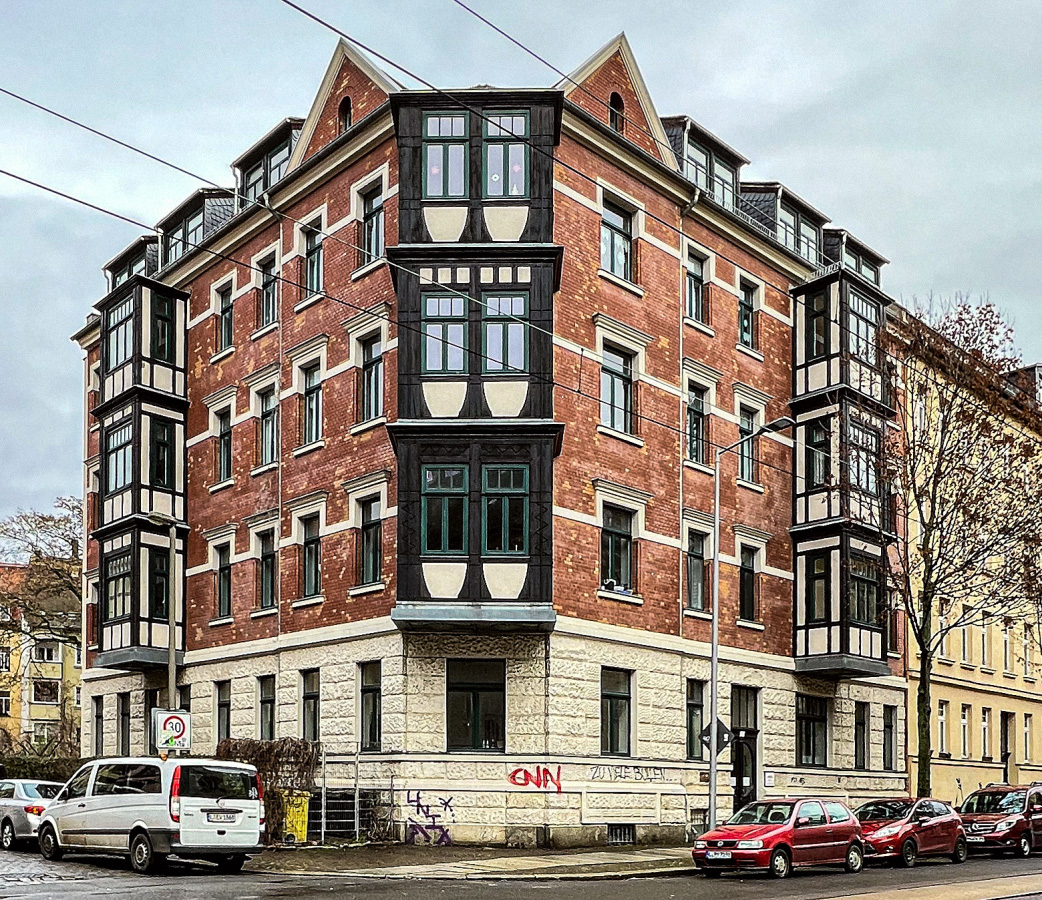
Residential building in the Bülowviertel (2022)

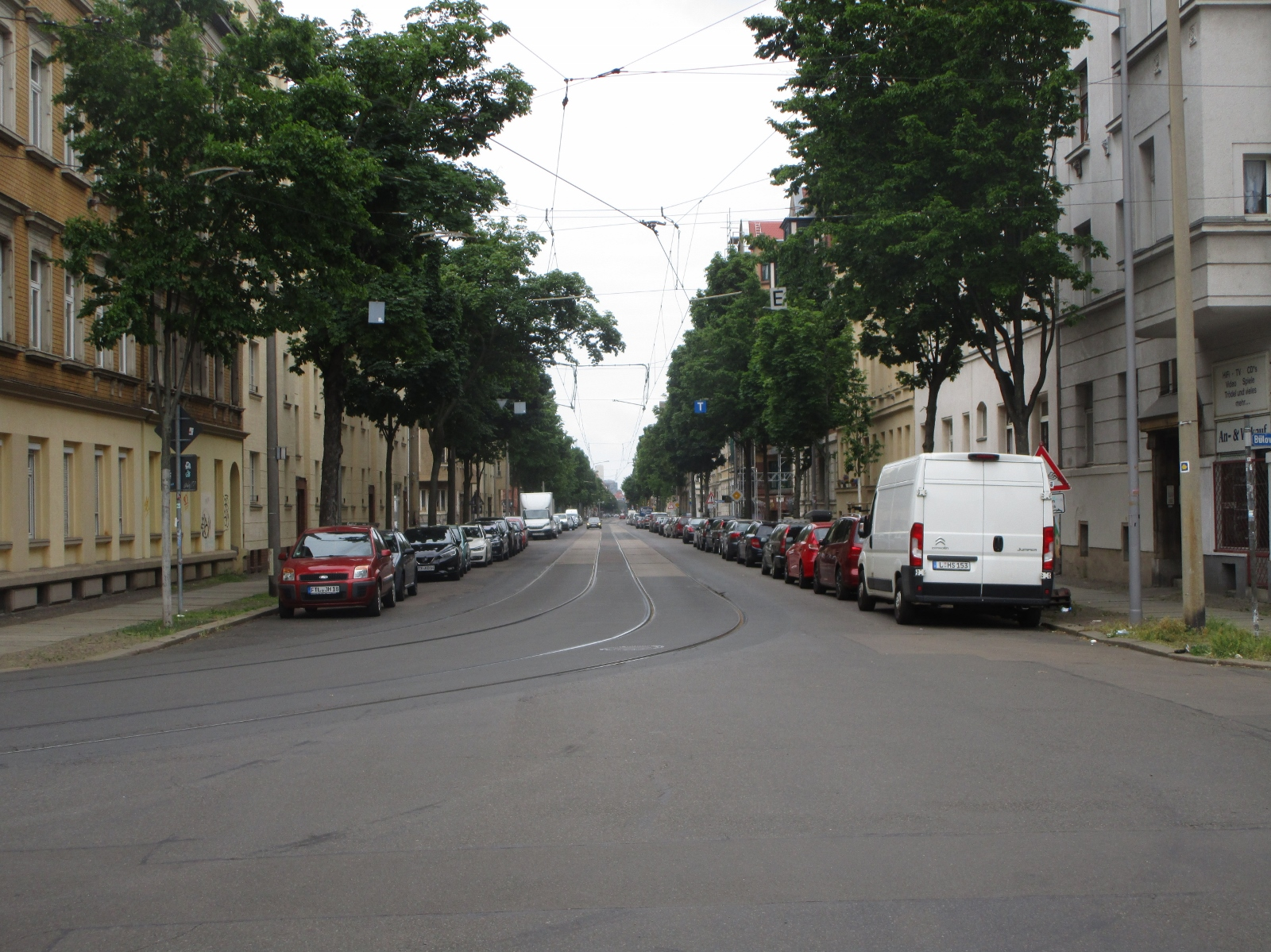
Tracks bending into Annenstrasse (2021)

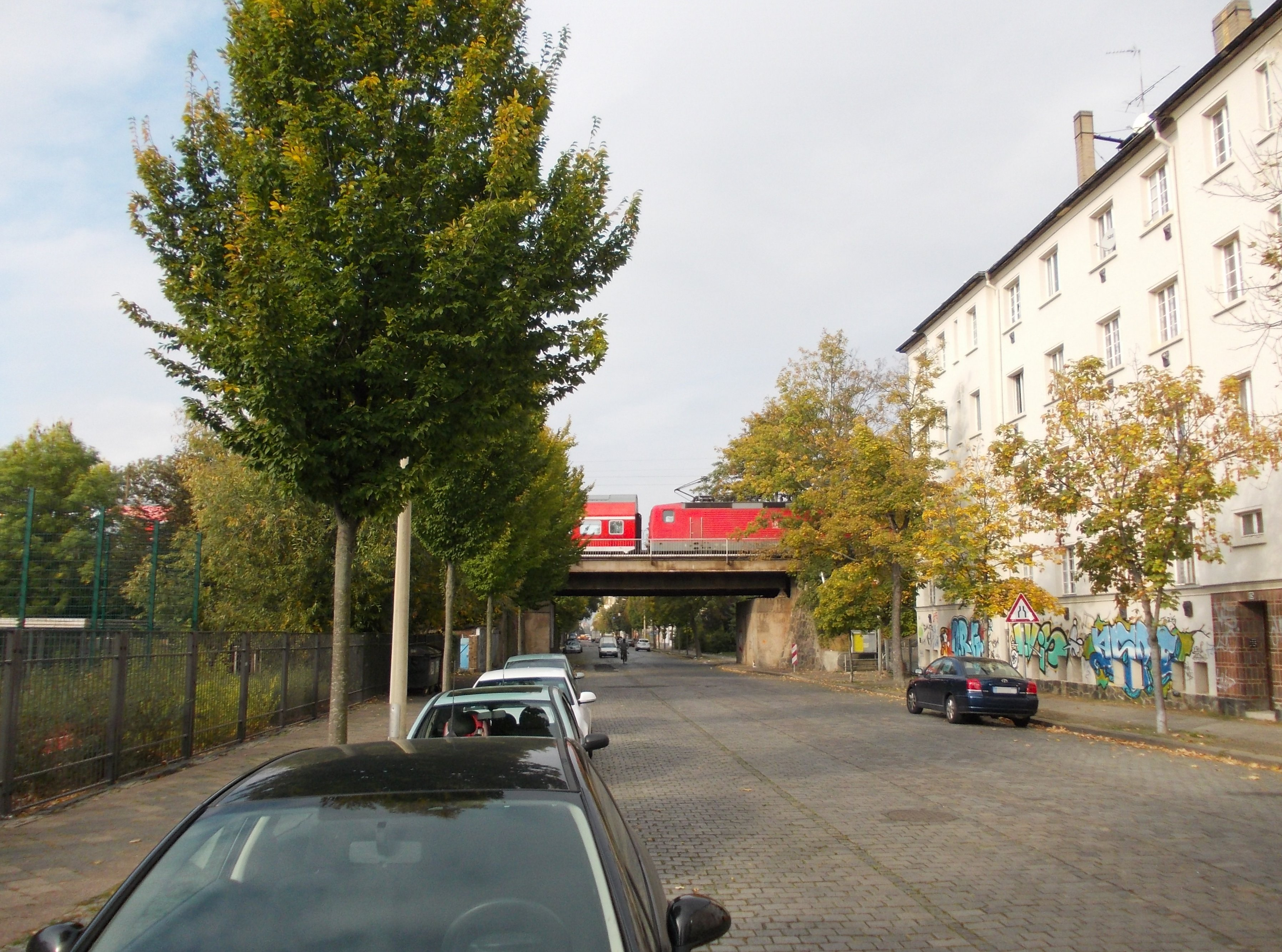
Crossing railway embankment (2012)

== History ==
=== 19th and 20th centuries ===
From 1835, the railway line to Dresden was built on the course of today's road. On 24 April 1837, the first train on this line ran to Althen. As a result, the growing eastern vorstadt was initially divided into two localities on both sides of the railway embankment. In 1879, the line was laid a little further north in an arc and both Eisenbahnstrasse and buildable areas were created for the new building areas Neustadt north of Eisenbahnstrasse and Neuschönefeld south of Eisenbahnstrasse. The land belonged to the Schönefeld manor and was bought up for this purpose by merchants such as Carl Lampe.

The first section of the line of the Leipzig Horse-drawn Railway to Neuschönefeld was opened on 22 December 1882. On the still narrow Eisenbahnstraße, it initially ran on a single track to the corner of Kirchstrasse (today: Hermann-Liebmann-Strasse), then from 14 May 1887 to Torgauer Strasse.

The incorporation into Leipzig took place in 1890.

Along Eisenbahnstrasse, 4- to 5-storey apartment buildings were built on both sides, mostly built between 1889 and 1910. The neighborhood was a working-class neighborhood. There are often shops on the ground floor. Today, the majority of these houses are listed buildings, as are other houses from the 1920s to 1930s at the eastern end of Eisenbahnstrasse.

From 1945 to 1991, Eisenbahnstraße was called Ernst-Thälmann-Strasse, which was intended to commemorate the communist rally with Ernst Thälmann on 9 April 1932 with 30,000 participants. However, the rally did not take place directly in Eisenbahnstrasse, but on the nearby Volkmarsdorfer Markt. In the language of the GDR, the street was a Magistrale, mainly because of its many shops. However, the decay of the houses and the beginning of vacancies were unmistakable. After the fall of the Berlin Wall and the peaceful revolution in East Germany, the western part of Eisenbahnstrasse from Rosa-Luxemburg-Strasse to Hermann-Liebmann-Strasse became part of the Neustädter Markt redevelopment area (Sanierungsgebiet Neustädter Markt, council decision of 17 August 1992). In 2000, Eisenbahnstrasse also became a Soziale Stadt programme area and a funding area of the European Regional Development Fund (ERDF).

=== 21st century ===
As a radial street, Eisenbahnstrasse had a high traffic occupancy. Relief from through traffic occurred at the beginning of the 2000s with the completion of Adenauerallee between Rackwitzer Strasse and Torgauer Strasse, which has the function of a northern tangent for the settlement areas on Eisenbahnstrasse. This was taken as an opportunity to rebuild Eisenbahnstrasse. The conversion was carried out with the aim of creating a multi-purpose city street to stabilize the adjacent neighborhoods and to speed up the tram.

In the 1990s, more and more immigrants moved into the streets. After a phase of shrinking populations, it increased again from 1999 onwards. After completion of the funding measures in 2020, 86% of the plots had been renovated or newly developed.

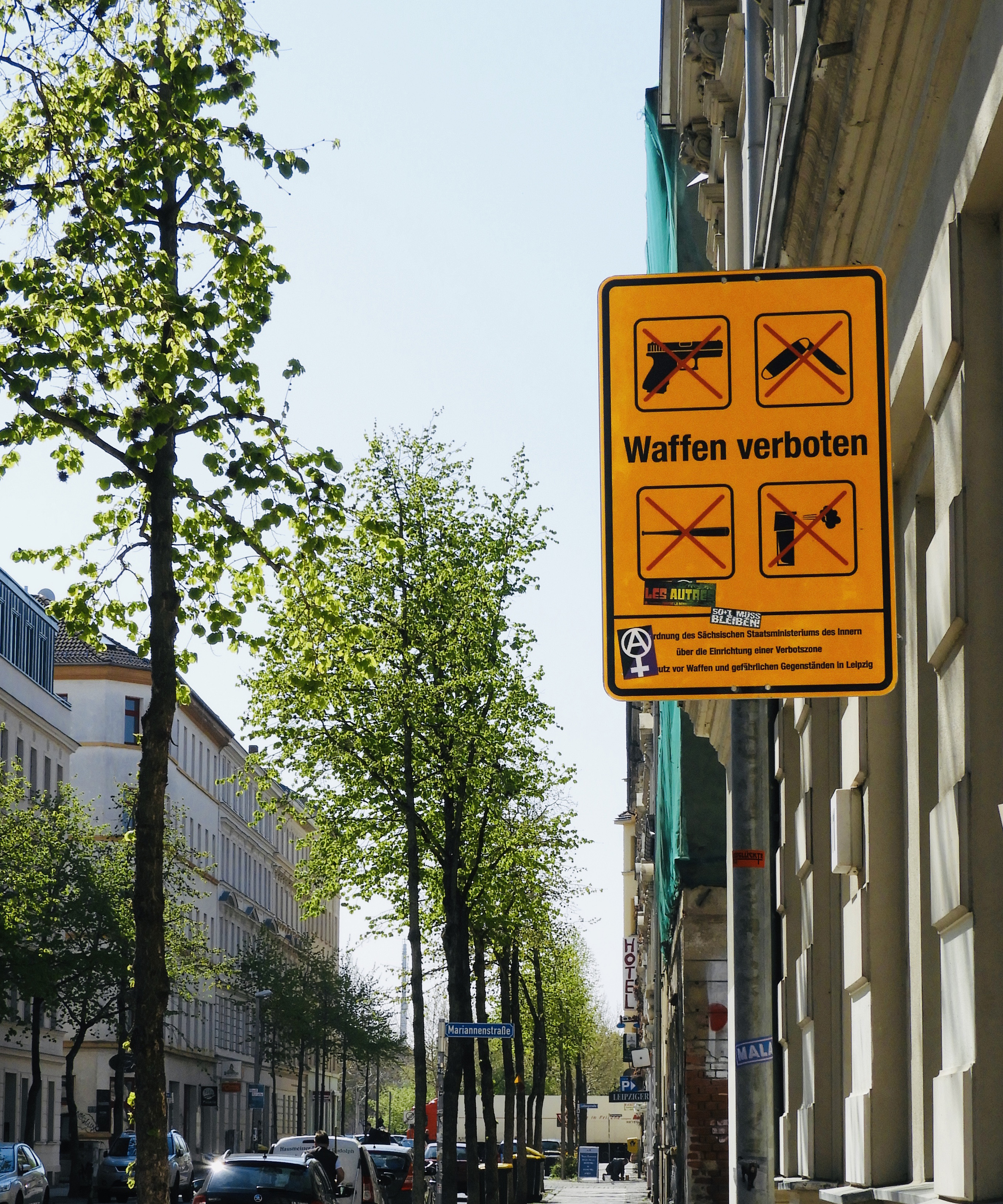
Signage "Waffen verboten" ("Weapons prohibited", 2019)

The area around Eisenbahnstraße has been the focus of police measures since the 2000s at the latest and is characterized, also in the media, as a focus of drug-related crime. Since September 2009, the intersection of Eisenbahnstrasse/Hermann-Liebmann-Strasse has been under video surveillance, as it is a crime hotspot according to the police. In June 2016, a group of about 20 Hells Angels invaded Eisenbahnstrasse as the "territory" of the rival United Tribuns. Despite an address by the police (in German: Gefährdetenansprache), there was a shootout between the clubs. Three rockers were seriously injured in hospital, two of them had shots in the stomach. There, a member of the United Tribuns finally died.

Even before that, some media had attached the controversial label of "Germany's most dangerous street" to the street.

From 2018 to 2025, Eisenbahnstraße was part of a gun ban zone. Although the regulation was declared invalid by the Sächsisches Oberverwaltungsgericht (Saxon Higher Administrative Court) in 2021, the signage was not removed and checks continued to be carried out. The Saxon Ministry of the Interior declared that it would abolish the prohibition zone as soon as a planned police station is set up on Eisenbahnstrasse, for which no property had yet been found by April 2024. The police station was opened in June 2025 and the gun ban zone was lifted with effect from 21 August 2025.

Eisenbahnstrasse continues to be the scene of police operations against clan crime.

Selection of shop signs (2025)

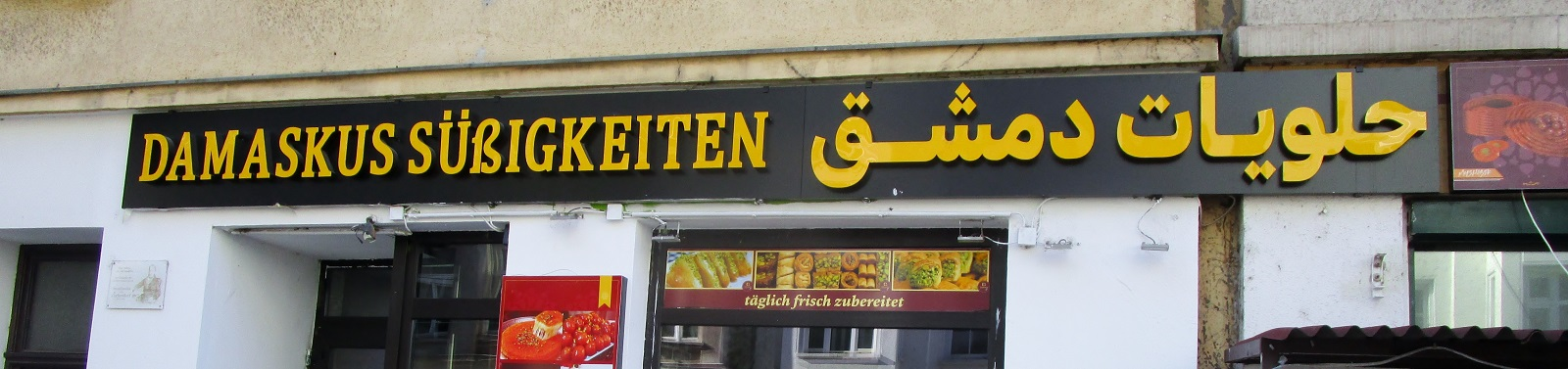
Damaskus Süßigkeiten (Damascus Sweets)

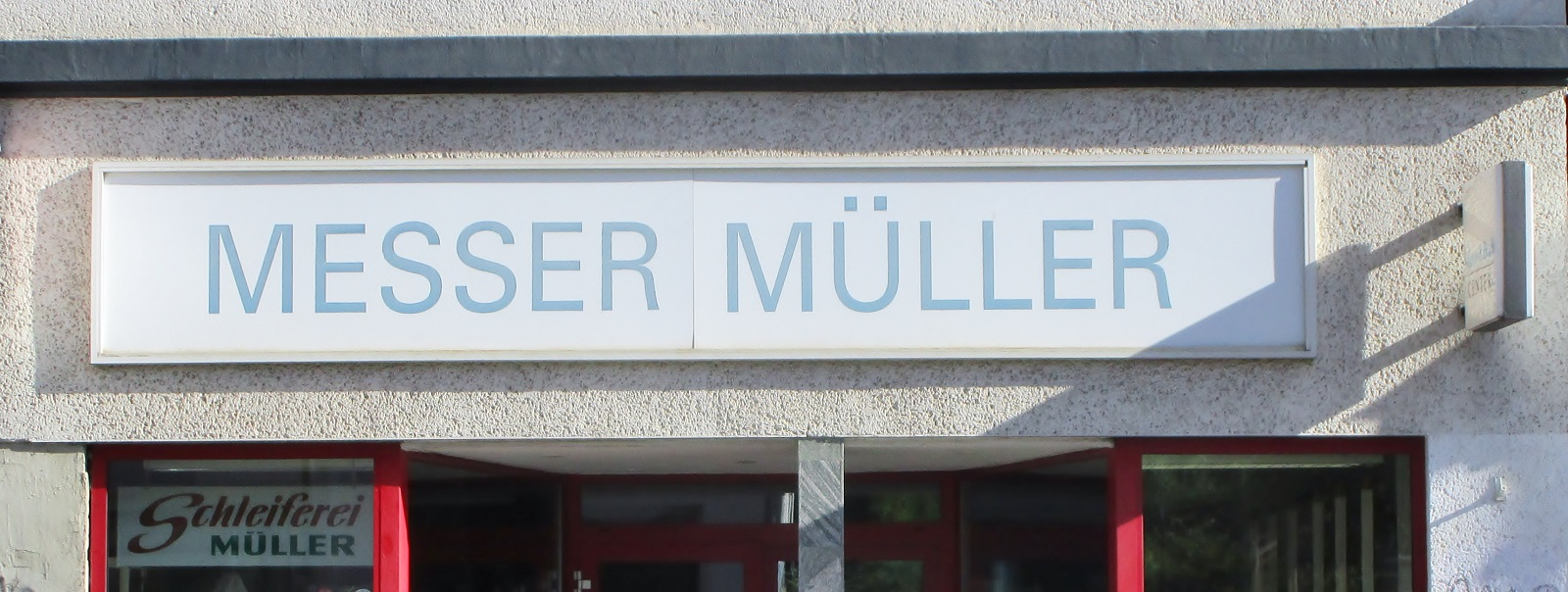
Messer Müller (Müller Knives)

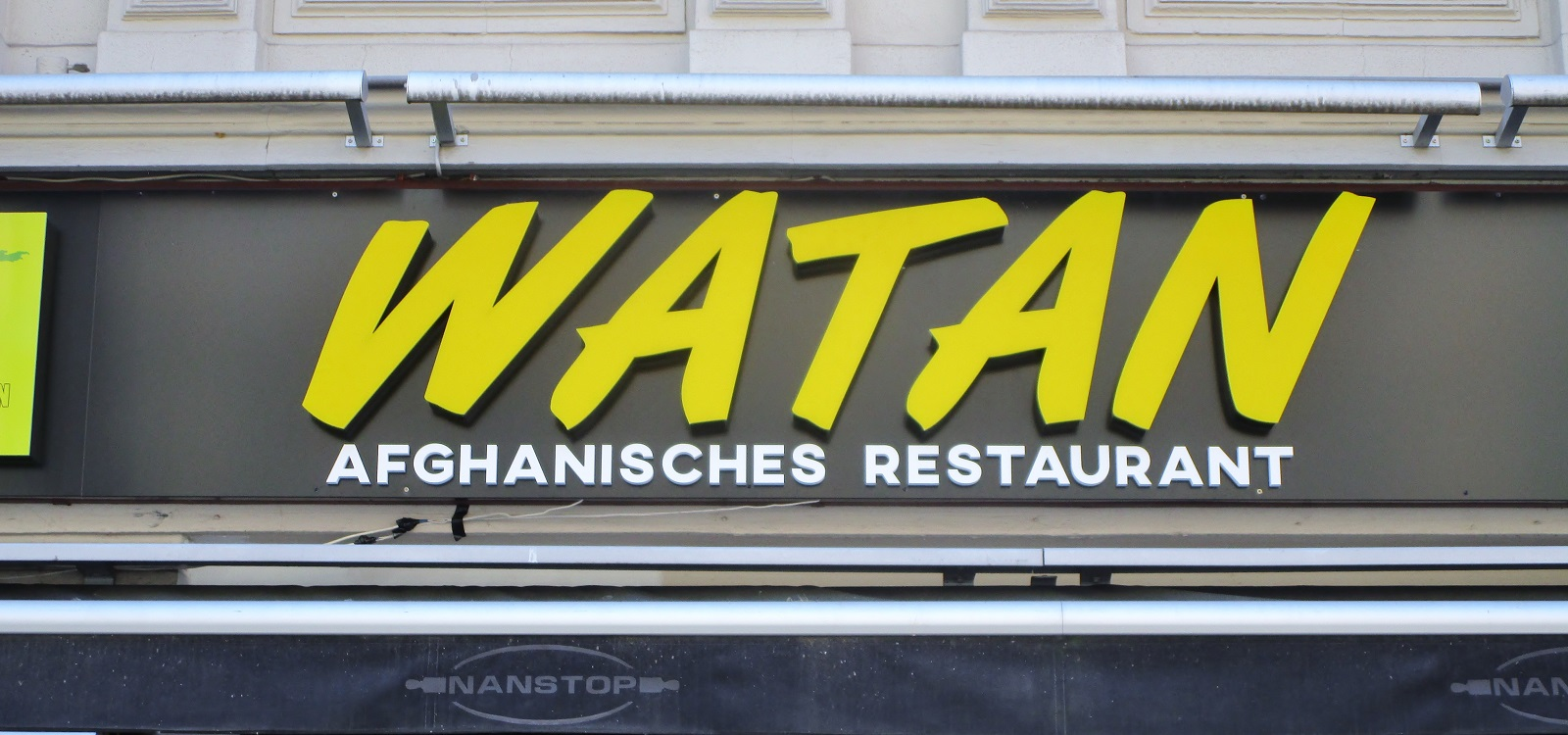
Watan - Afghan Restaurant

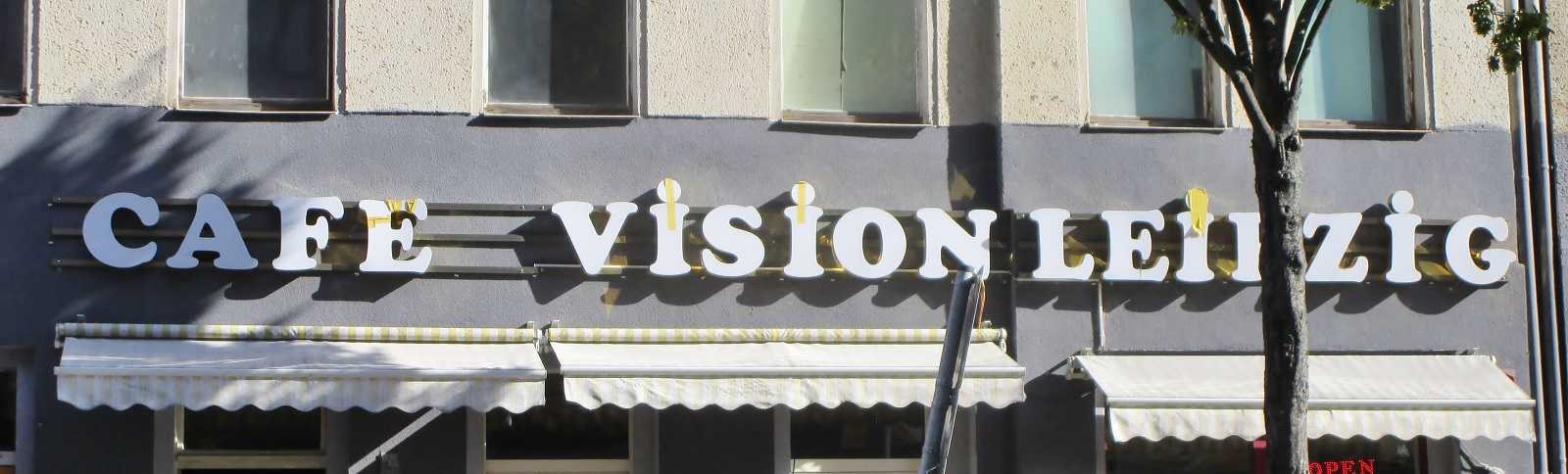
Café Vision Leipzig

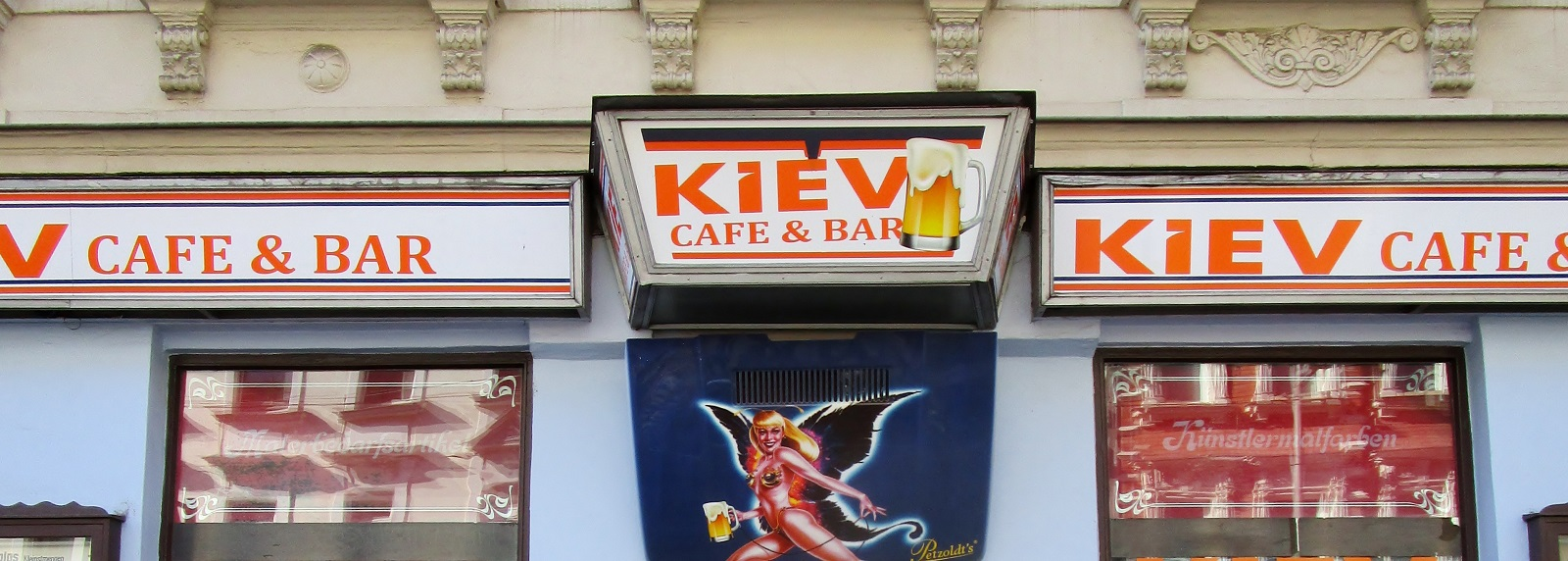
Café and Bar Kiev

A completely different narrative is that of the "trendy district", characterized by "internationality" and "diversity", which is in high demand. Since about 2019, tendencies towards gentrification have been described, especially in terms of shop rents. The number of active shops and eateries has risen from 112 (2007) to 188 (2019). Many are an expression of a "migrant economy". On 17 June 2020, the city council adopted a social preservation statute (Soziale Erhaltungssatzung) for the "Eisenbahnstrasse" area.

Since 2023, an alliance of individuals and associations has been organizing a Parking Day once a year.

== Reception ==
Harald Kirschner as photographer and Hans Sonntag as author have produced a work that realistically depicts the conditions in what was then Ernst-Thälmann-Strasse and the surrounding area in the final days of the GDR. From 2021 to 2022, the writer Dmitrij Kapitelman reported in the magazine Reportagen about Eisenbahnstrasse, where he has lived since 2020.

== See also ==
- List of streets and squares in Leipzig
