= Lindenauer Markt =

Square in Leipzig, Germany

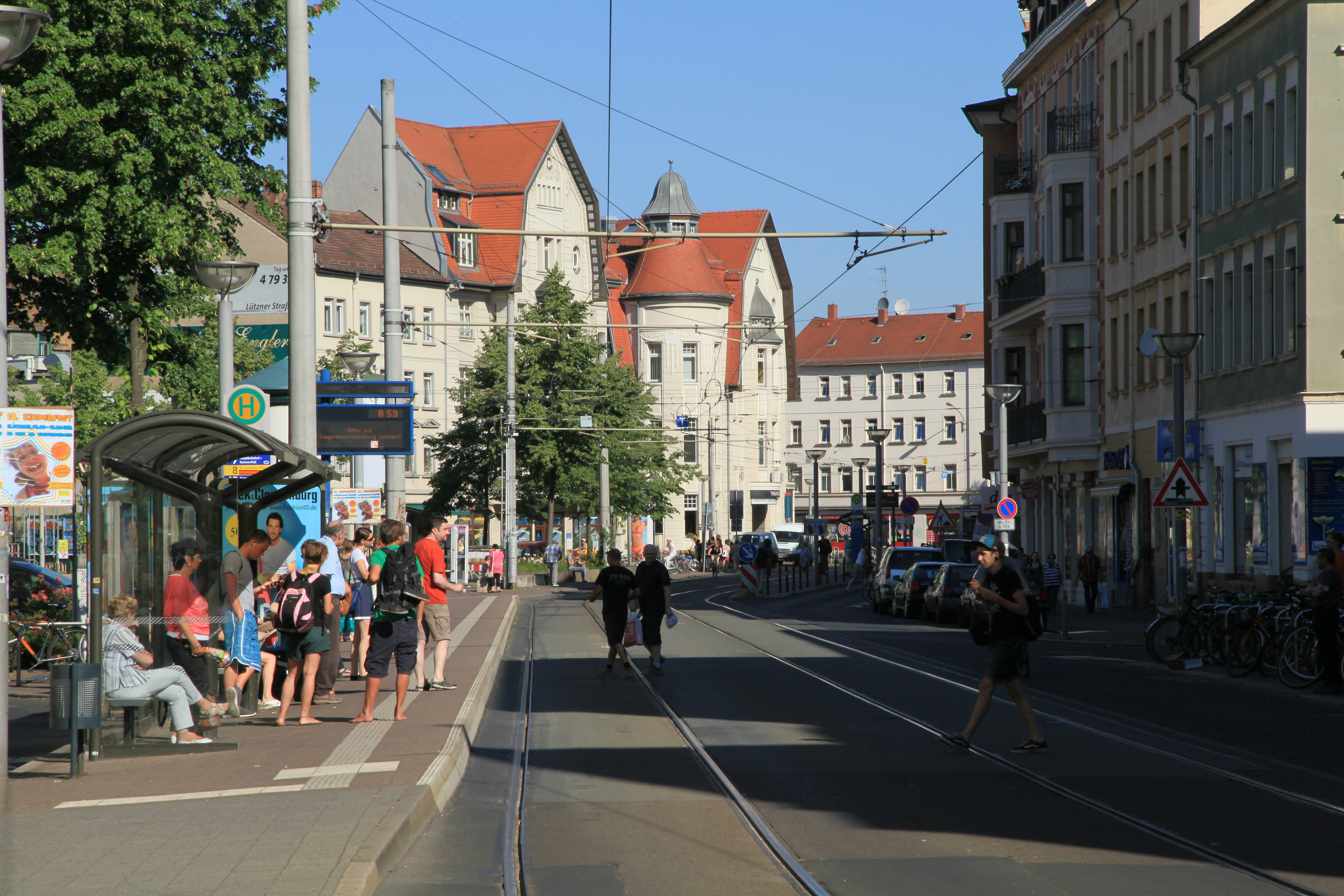
- Tram stop Lindenauer Markt
- Interactive map of Lindenauer Markt
- Former names: Teichplatz (until 1869), Markt (1869–1907), Wilhelm-Liebknecht-Platz (1947–1992)
- Location: Leipzig, Germany
- Postal code: 04177
- Coordinates: 51°20′13.8″N 12°20′4.1″E

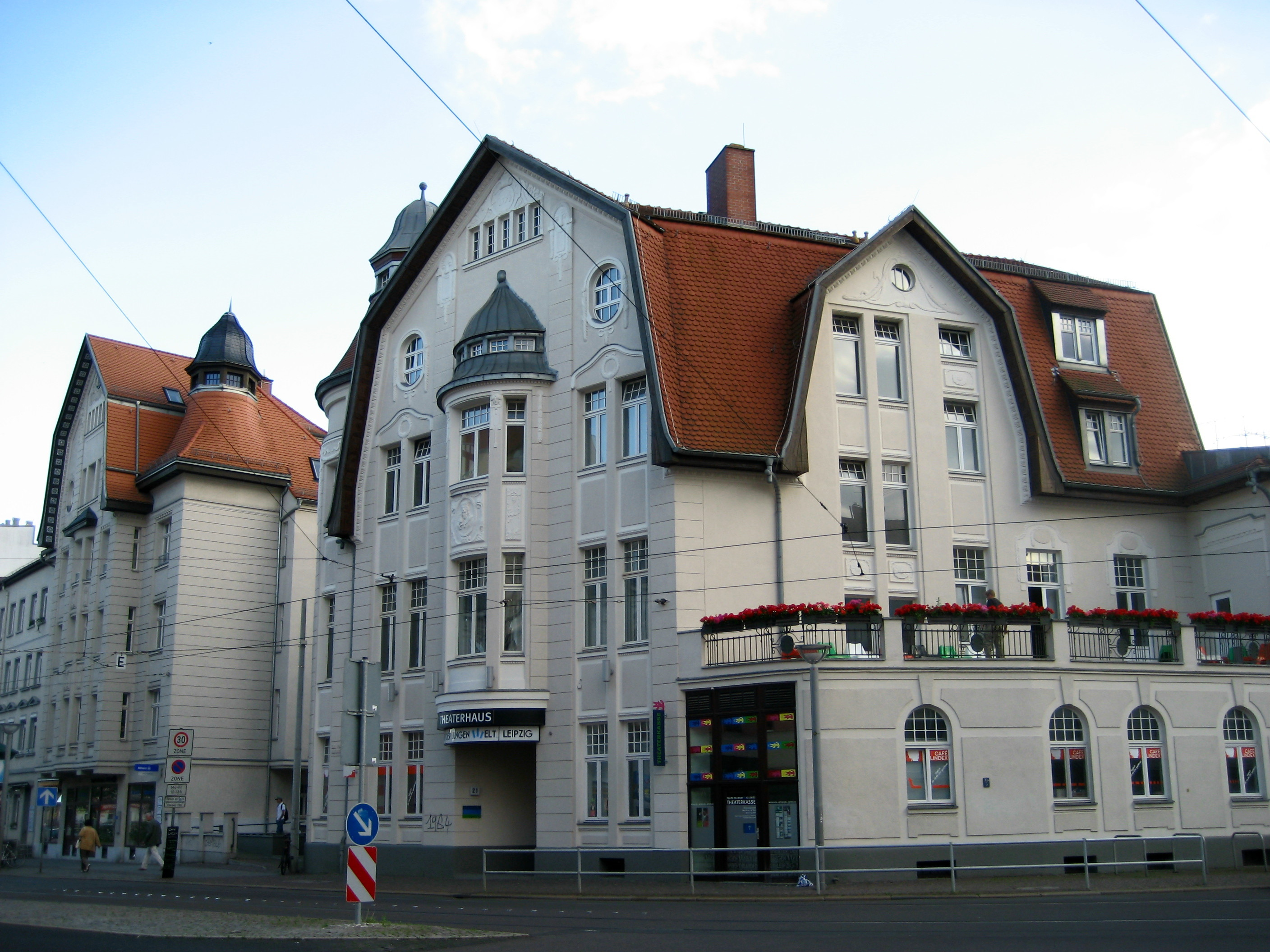
Theatre-house Theater der Jungen Welt

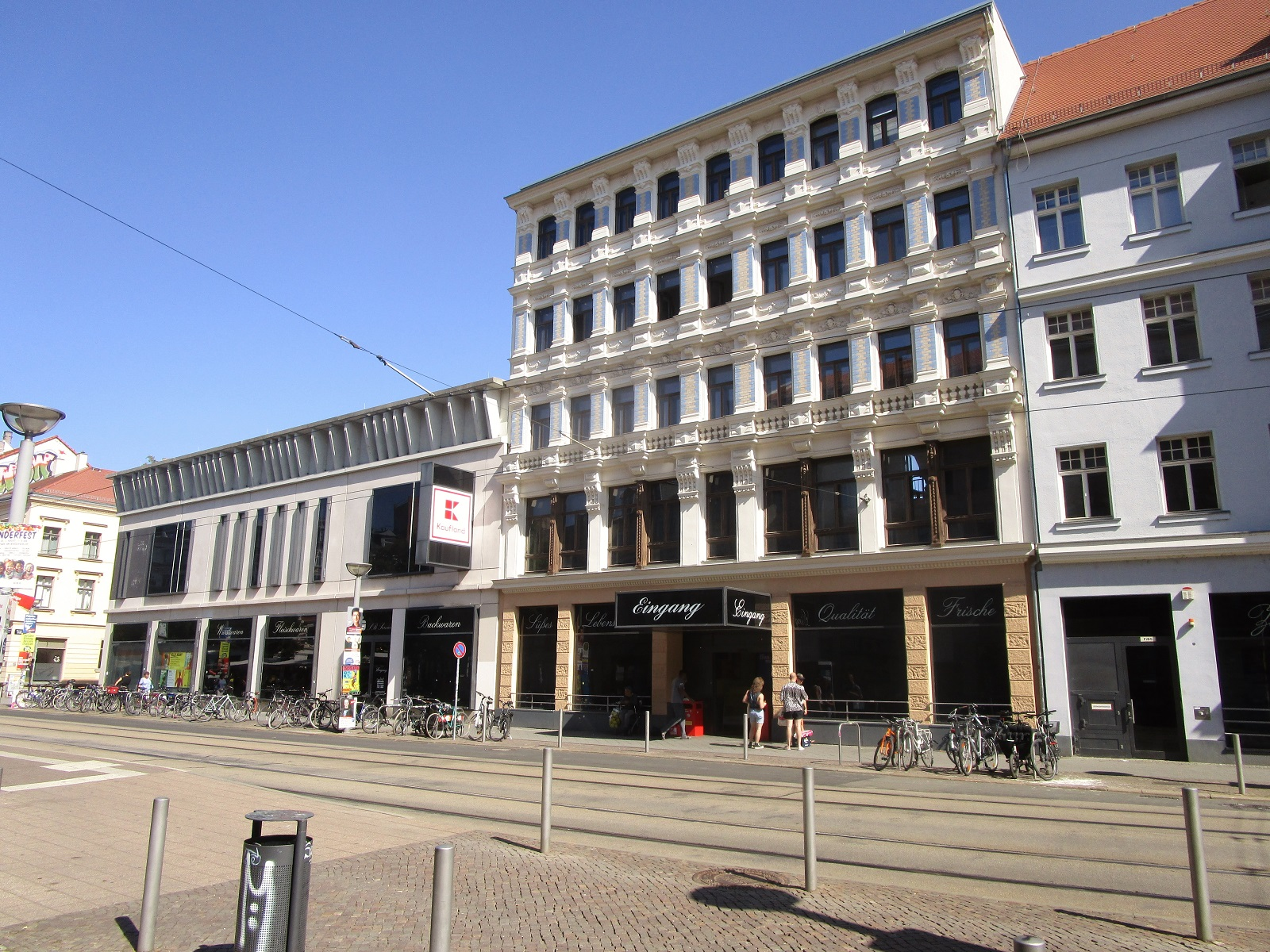
Behind the historic facades is a Kaufland hypermarket

The Lindenauer Markt (litt.: Lindenau market) is a square in Leipzig, Germany. It is in Lindenau which is part of the Leipzig borough Alt-West. The square has both historical and modern significance and is characterized by numerous shops, restaurants and the theatre-house Theater der Jungen Welt.

== History ==
The history of the Lindenau market is closely linked to the development of the former village of Lindenau, which was an independent municipality until it was incorporated into Leipzig in 1891. The name "Lindenau market" goes back to the oldest market square in the municipality. It was the area between the Eselsteich (litt.: Donkey Pond) and the larger village pond. After the pond areas were filled in during 1867, this area became the area of today's Lindenauer Markt. In the municipality of Lindenau, the market place served as an important social and economic meeting place.

Over time, the name of the Lindenauer Markt changed many times. These developments are largely derived from political and social developments. The square was originally called "Teichplatz" (litt.: Pond Place) due to its topography. In 1869 it was given the name "Markt" (Market), which showed its increased economic importance. It was not until 1907 that the square was renamed "Lindenauer Markt" for the first time. After the Second World War, the square was called "Wilhelm-Liebknecht-Platz" from 1947 to 1992, named after the social democrat Wilhelm Liebknecht.

== Cultural center ==
On the northwestern edge of the square is the Theater der Jungen Welt, one of the oldest children's and youth theaters in Germany. The theater offers a varied program for all age groups. There are also artistic craft shops and small studios, the St'atour art and culture center and several restaurants on the Lindenau market.

== Shopping center ==
Since 2002, the Dr. Kuhn development company has been trying to build a shopping center at Lindenauer Markt. On 21 April 2010, the city council approved the "project-related development plan no. 286 Lindenauer Markt district center." The shopping center, operated by the Kaufland hypermarket chain, was built on the southeastern edge of the square behind the facades of the listed buildings at Lindenauer Markt 4 and 2 and Kuhturmstraße 1. It was opened on 10 May 2012 with a shopping area of 3,700 square metres (39,826 sq ft). A parking deck, not visible from Lindenauer Markt, has 235 spaces.

== Listed buildings ==
The residential and commercial buildings Lindenauer Markt 1, 2, 3, 4, 5, 7, 9, 10, 11, 12, 13a, 14, 16 18, 19, 19a and 20 as well as the theater house with the house number 21 are on the list of cultural monuments.

== Meuten Memorial ==
On 25 April 2025, a memorial site called “Meuten Memorial” was inaugurated on the Lindenauer Markt, commemorating the Leipzig Meuten.

== Miscellaneous ==
A farmer's market takes place on the square twice a week. In 2019, a drinking fountain was built on the west side of the square.

== See also ==
- List of streets and squares in Leipzig
