= Purlieu =

Outlying parts of a place or district

Purlieu is a term used for the outlying parts of a place or district. It was a term of the old Forest law, and meant, as defined by John Manwood, Treatise of the Lawes of the Forest (1598, 4th ed. 1717),

a certain territory of ground adjoining unto the forest [which] was once forest-land and afterwards disafforested by the perambulations made for the severing of the new forests from the old

The owner of freelands in the purlieu to the yearly value of forty shillings was known as a purlieu-man or purley-man. The benefits of disafforestation accrued only to the owner of the lands. There seems no doubt that purlieu or purley represents the Anglo-French pourallé lieu (old French pouraler, puraler, to go through Latin perambulare), a legal term meaning properly a perambulation to determine the boundaries of a manor, parish, or similar region.

The word survives in placenames. Examples include Dibden Purlieu in Hampshire, on the border of the New Forest, and Bedford Purlieus, once part of Rockingham Forest; also as Purley, in London, and Purley on Thames, in Berkshire. It also survives in the surname, Purley.

== Bibliography ==
- Rackham, Oliver (1976) Trees and Woodland in the British Landscape. (London: J.M.Dent & Sons Ltd.) ISBN 0-460-04183-5.
