= Pearly, Virginia =

Unincorporated community in Virginia, United States

Coordinates: 37°16′27″N 82°08′36″W

Pearly is an unincorporated community in Buchanan County, Virginia, United States.

== History ==
A post office was established at Pearly in 1903, and remained in operartion until it was discontinued in 1958. Pearly was the name of an area woman.
