= Purley (name) =

Purley is both a surname and a given name.

== People ==
Notable people with the name include:

- David Purley (1945-1985), British race driver
- Purley Baker (1858–1924), American Methodist minister

== Fictional characters ==
- Purley is the surname of several characters in the 1996 film Secrets & Lies (film)
