= Unikatum Children's Museum, Leipzig =

Unikatum Children's Museum
- Unikatum Kindermuseum
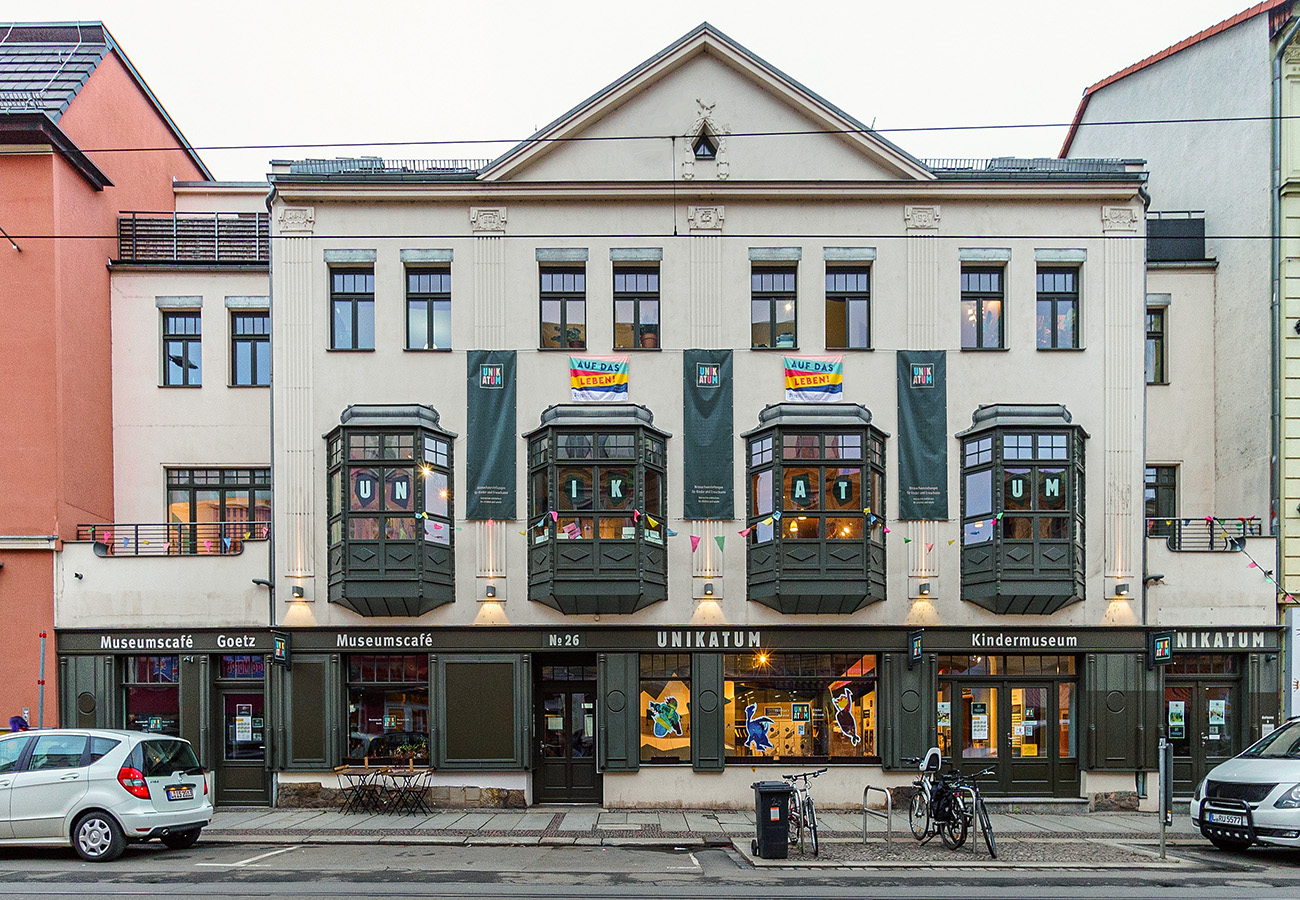
- Exterior of the museum (2021)
- Established: 2010
- Location: Leipzig, Germany
- Coordinates: 51°19′53.23″N 12°20′17.23″E
- Type: Children's museum
- Visitors: 45,000
- Director: Annegret Hänsel
- Public transit access: Tram stop Felsenkeller
- Website: Website in English

The Unikatum Children's Museum (German: Unikatum Kindermuseum Leipzig) is a cultural institution with changing annual exhibitions on social issues in Leipzig, Germany. The interactive exhibitions for "Participation and Discovery" are aimed primarily at schools and families.

== Museum ==
The Children's Museum was founded in 2010 by exhibition planner Annegret Hänsel and has been run by her on a voluntary basis ever since. The institution is supported by a Gemeinnützige GmbH (non-profit limited company) and supported by a booster club. The vast majority of the operation of the museum is made possible by voluntary work. In 2017, the museum was significantly expanded and since then has offered space for several exhibitions, a courtyard garden and the coffeehouse "Museumscafé Goetz", which is also used for exhibitions.

Building condition

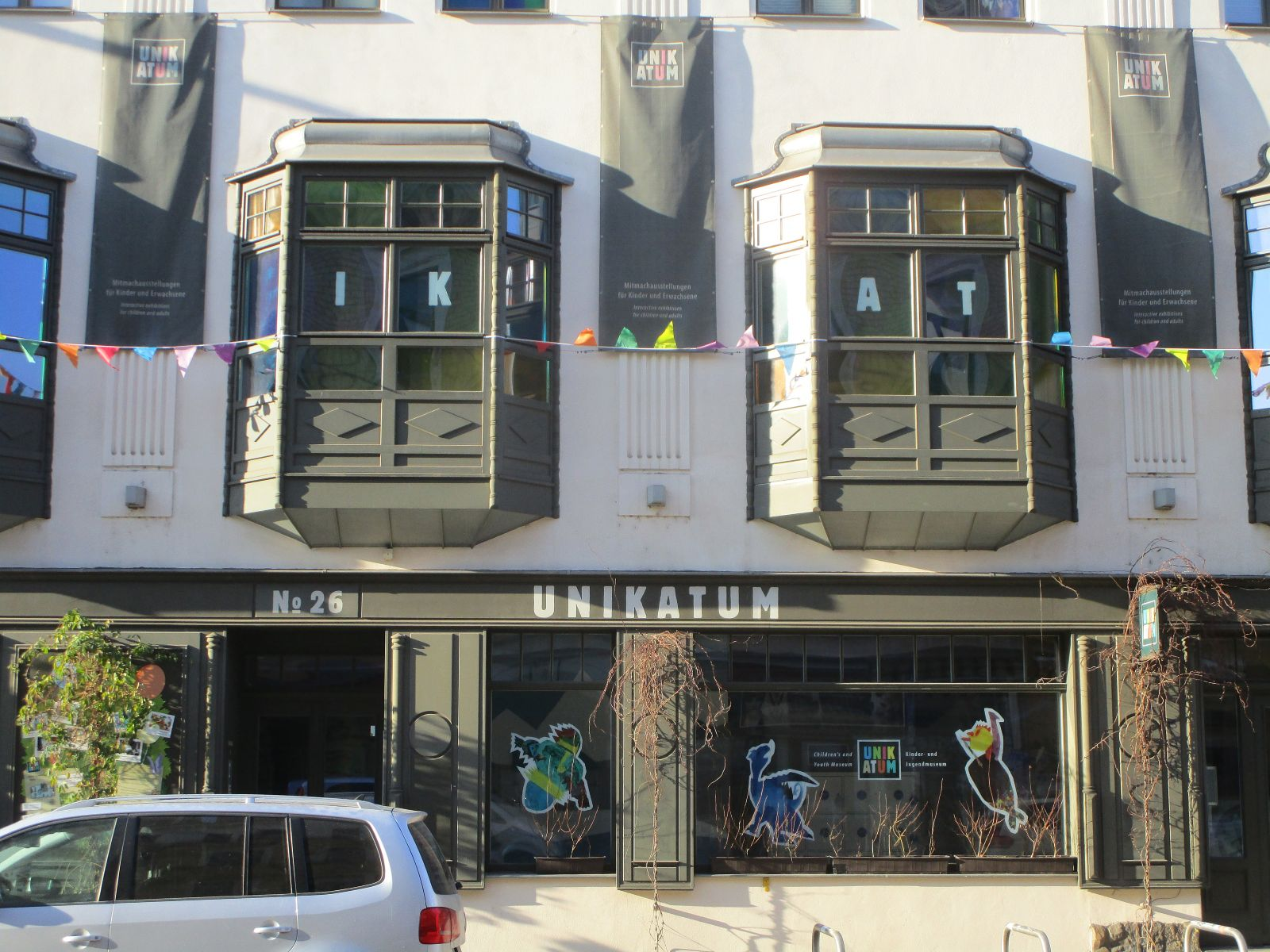
In 2026 and ...

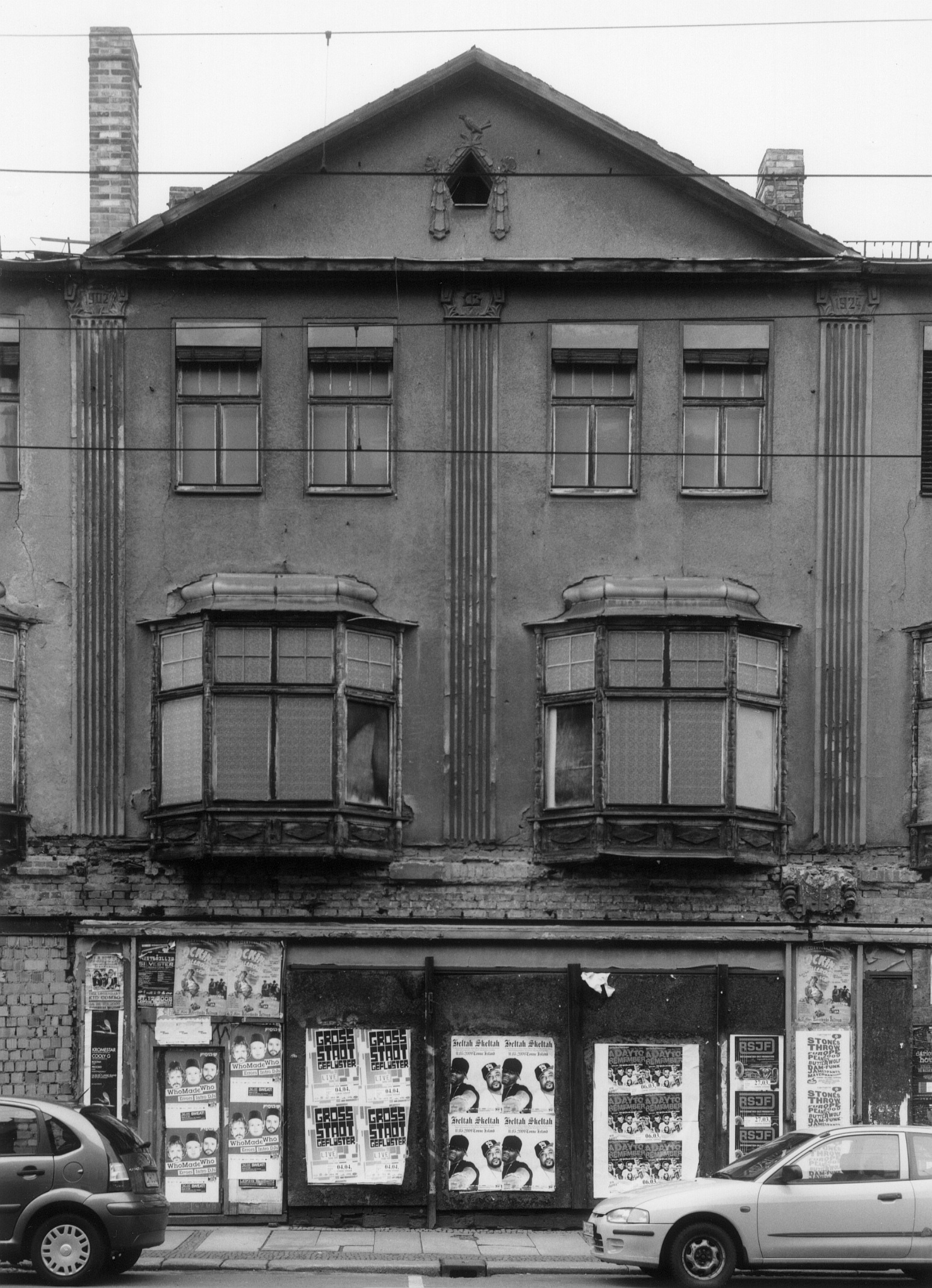
... in 2009 - before the Children's Museum moved in.

In 2012, the museum received the Sächsischer Preis für soziokulturelles Engagement (Saxon Prize for Socio-Cultural Involvement) from the Kulturstiftung des Freistaats Sachsen (Cultural Foundation of the Free State of Saxony). In 2014, the Unikatum Children's Museum won first place in the Familienfreundlichkeitspreis der Stadt Leipzig (Family-Friendliness Award of the City of Leipzig).

== Exhibitions ==
Every year, school students participate in the development and design of the new annual exhibition as part of a summer workshop. The location is the refurbished "Café Goetz" building in the Plagwitz locality of Leipzig.

- 2010/2011: "Shillings and sixpence – a playful history of money"
- 2011/2012: "Oh God – a journey through the world of faith"
- 2012/2013: "About Time"
- 2013/2014: "Balderdash – Adventures in the jungle of language"
- 2014/2015: "Heartbeat – rollercoaster of emotions"
- 2015/2016: "The City Machine"
- 2016/2017: "The Crazy World Hotel"
- 2017/2018: "Oh dear time!" – new, revised presentation (for children of reading age)
- since 2017: "Inventing the Future - Utopias between Doubt and Vision" (for young people and adults at the Museumscafé Goetz)
- since 2017: "The Kingdom of Imagination" (permanent exhibition for preschool and primary school children)
- 2017/2018: "Lots of Love" (for children from 10 years, adolescents and adults)
- 2018/2019: "Bionics - Nature's idea laboratory"
- since 2019: "World of Plenty" with "Garden of Plenty" (outdoor-museum)
- 2019/2020: "Climate Rally"
- since 2020: "If I were mayor"
