= Karl Heine Canal =

Canal in Leipzig, Germany

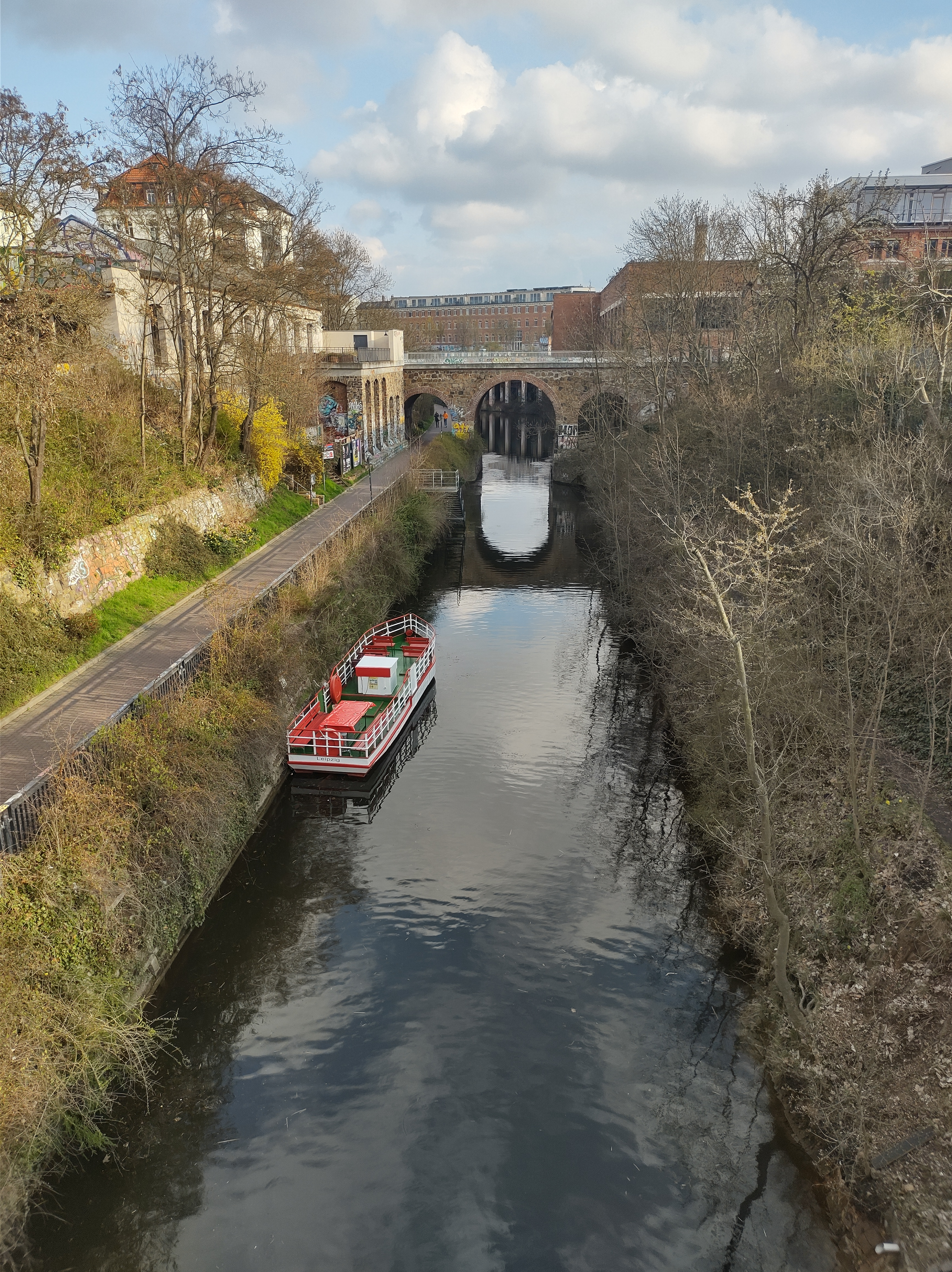
- View of the canal

Specifications
- Length: 3.3 km (2 mi)

History
- Construction began: 1856
- Date completed: 1898
- Date extended: 2015

Geography
- Start point: Confluence with the White Elster
- End point: Lindenau harbor
- Beginning coordinates: 51.326916617157°N 12.341133712997°E
- Ending coordinates: 51.329112°N 12.308657°E

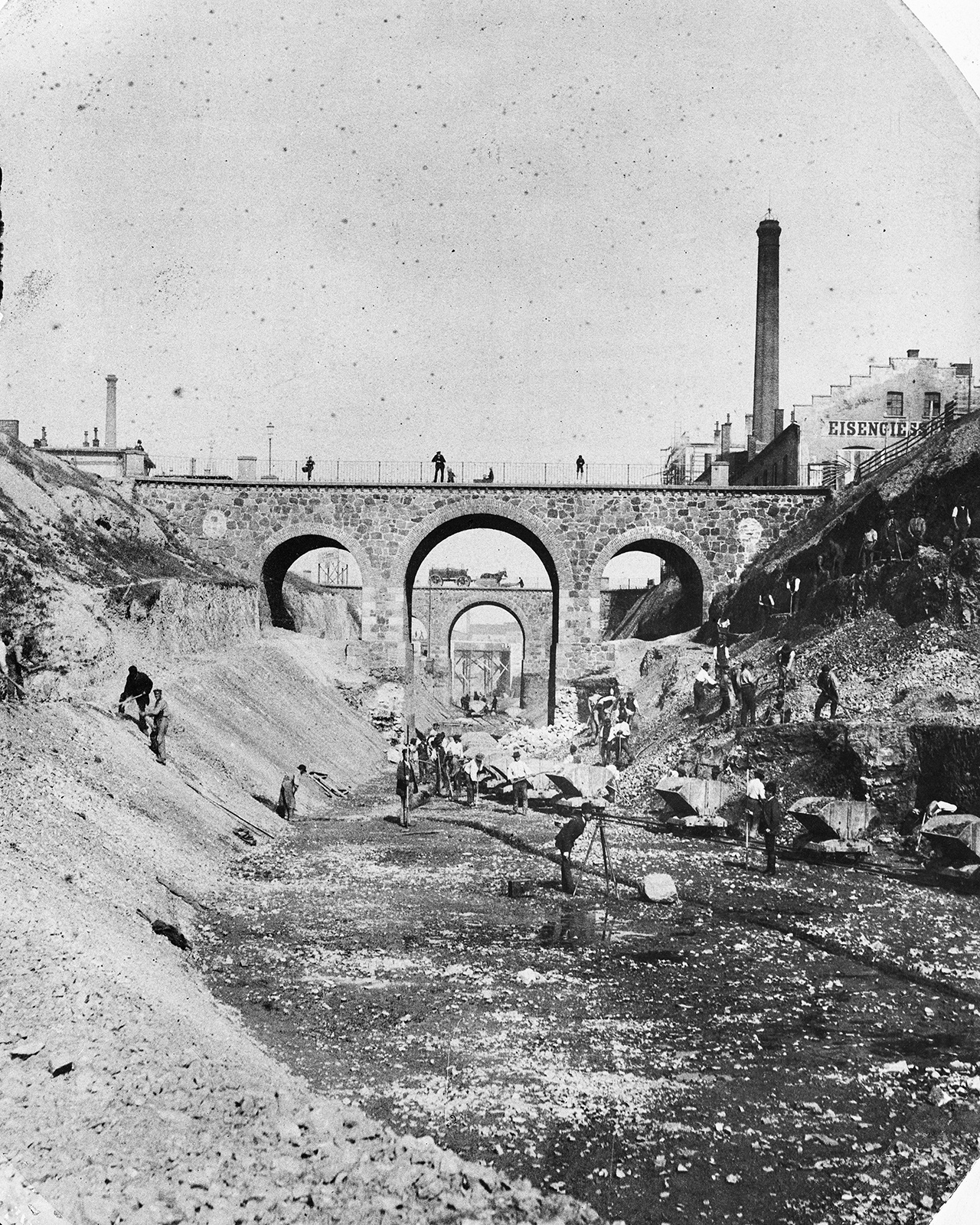
Canal construction around 1885

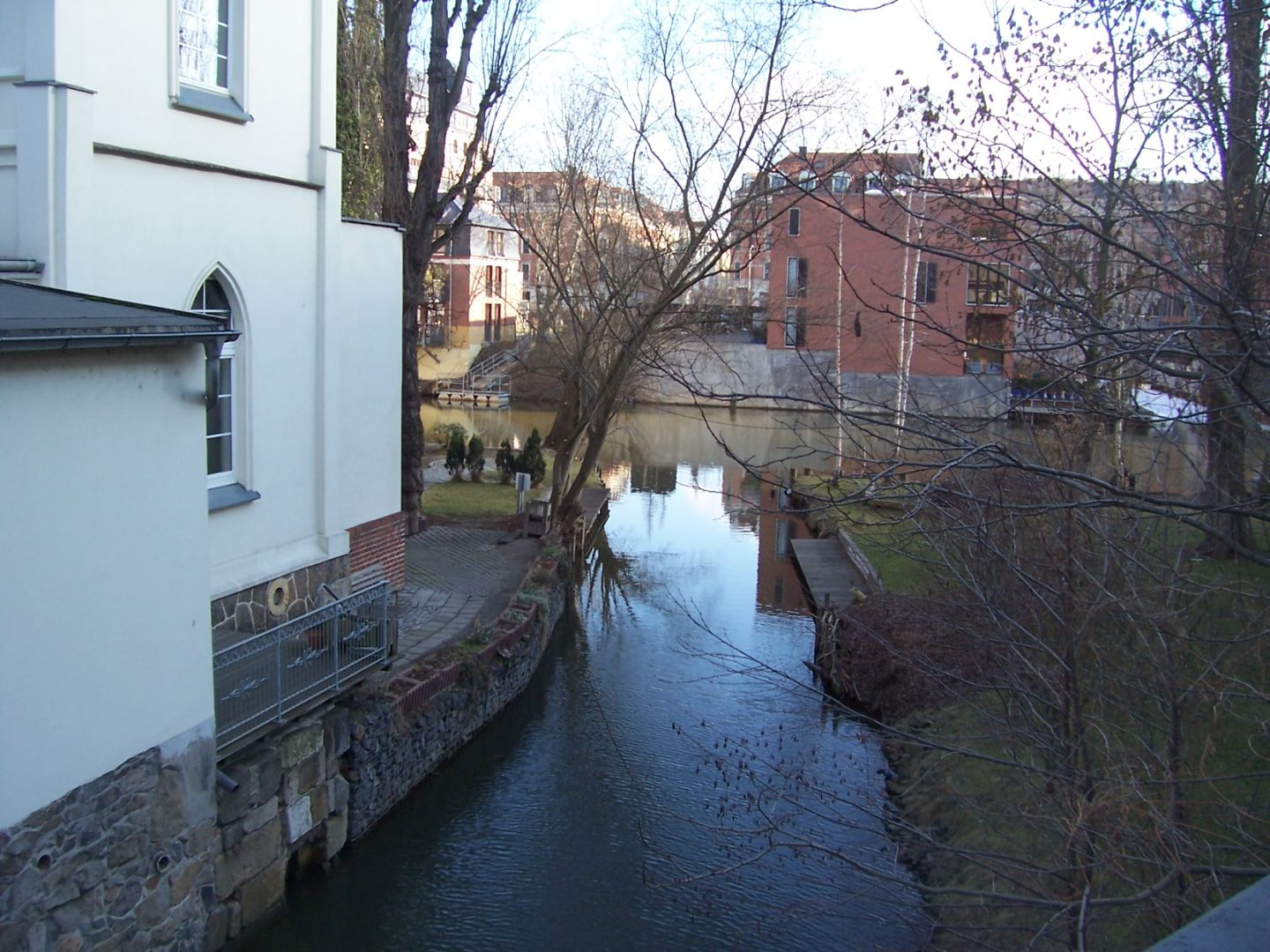
Begin of the canal at the White Elster

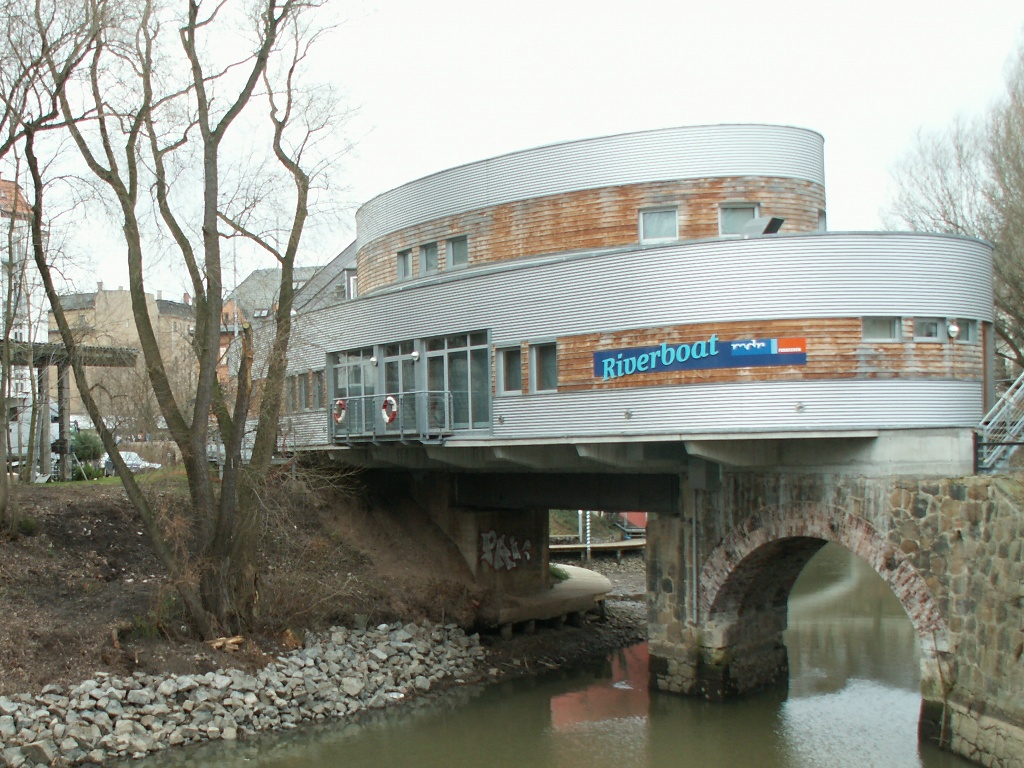
Building of the Riverboat stage

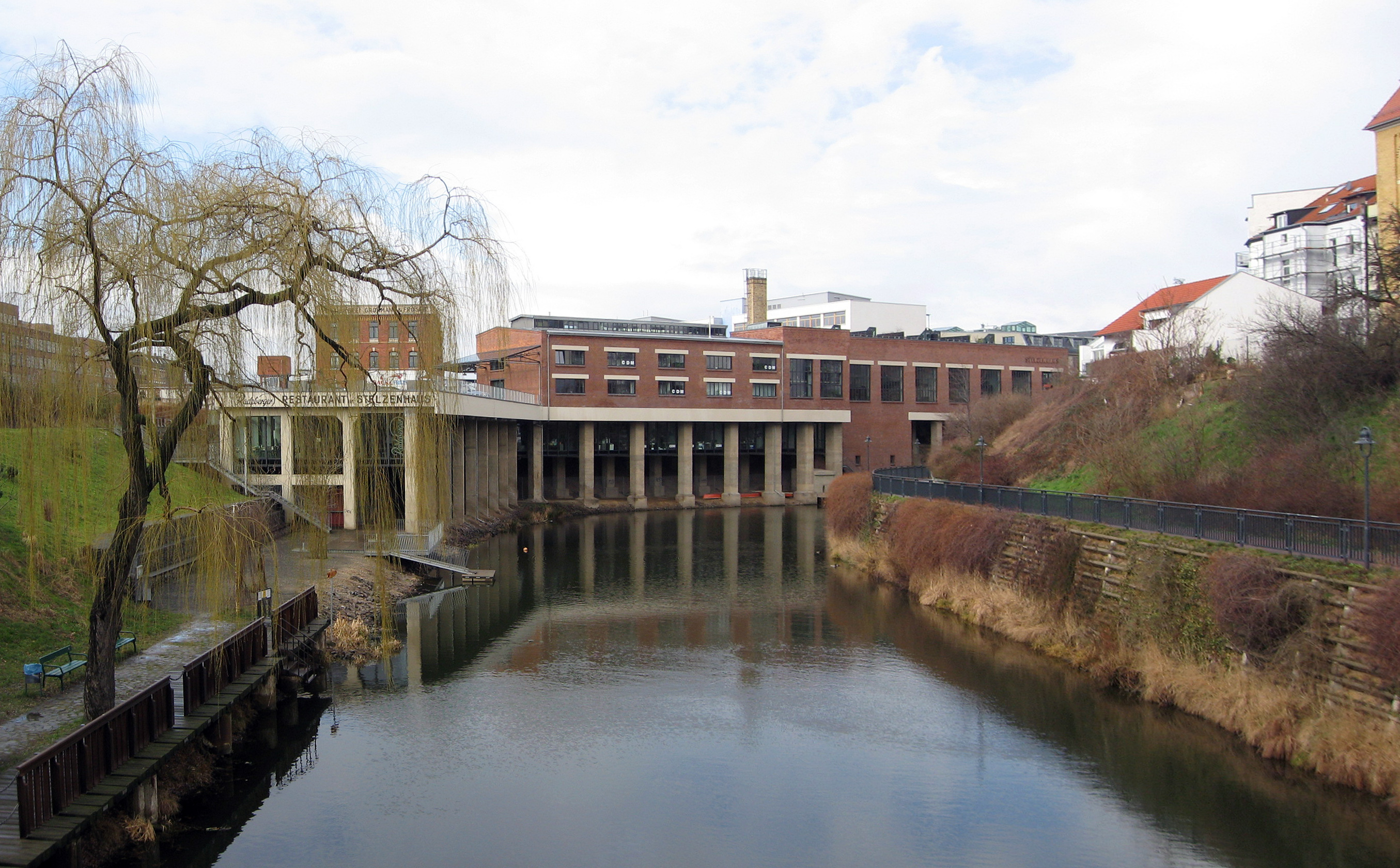
At the Stelzen House

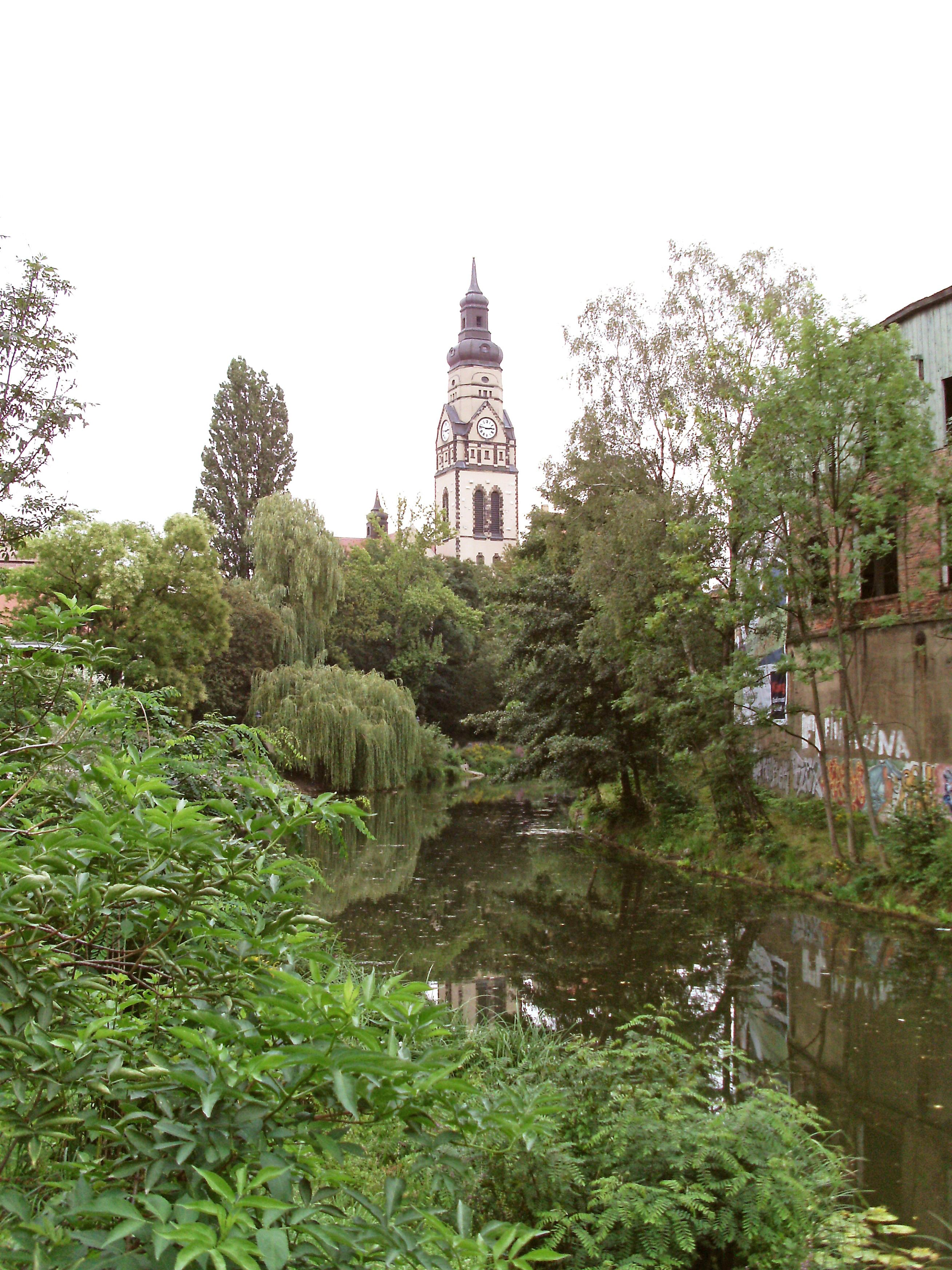
Tower of the Philippus Church in Lindenau in the background

The Karl Heine Canal is an approximately 3.3 km (2 mi) long artificial watercourse in the west of the city of Leipzig in Germany and connects the Lindenau harbor with the White Elster River. It is spanned by 15 bridges and is navigable with small boats. The canal is under monument protection as a monument preservation entity “canal, bank reinforcements and bridges”.

== Bridges ==
The following bridges cross the Karl-Heine-Canal (beginning at the confluence with the White Elster):

1. Nonnenbrücke (Nonnenstrasse road bridge)
2. Gleisbrücke P VIII (Bridge of the former industrial railway track Plagwitz VIII, built with the riverboat stage)
3. Elisabethbrücke (Erich-Zeigner-Allee road bridge)
4. König-Johann-Brücke (Zschocherschen Strasse road bridge), the bridge is named after John, King of Saxony (1801-1873)
5. Karl-Heine-Bogen (Bridge for cyclists and pedestrians)
6. Weißenfelser Brücke (Weißenfelser Strasse road bridge)
7. König-Albert-Brücke (Karl-Heine-Strasse road bridge), the bridge is named after Albert, King of Saxony (1828-1902)
8. Aurelienbrücke (Bridge for cyclists and pedestrians of the Aurelienstrase)
9. Gießerbrücke (Giesserstrasse road bridge)
10. Gleisbrücke P I (Bridge of the former industrial railway track Plagwitz I)
11. König-August-Brücke (Engertstrasse road bridge), the bridge is named after Frederick Augustus III of Saxony (1865-1932)
12. Railway bridge (Leipzig–Probstzella railway line)
13. Saalfelder Brücke (Saalfelder Strasse road bridge)
14. Am Kanal (Bridge for cyclists and pedestrians, replacement of the wooden superstructure with a steel superstructure, 2016)
15. Luisenbrücke (Lützner Straße road bridge; before 29 January 2015, the canal ended a few meters (feet) before that bridge)
16. Bridge over the entrance to the Lindenau harbor (Aluminium, 2015)

A special feature among the canal bridges is the Karl-Heine-Bogen, designed by the engineering firm König and Heunisch and the architects Pahl + Weber-Pahl. The tied arch structure of the arch bridge, which was inaugurated on 4 June 2000, was built using a hybrid construction method. To erect a solid slab, rigid V-shaped pairs of supports are connected to a curved tube with a span of 28 metres (92 ft). The slender cross-section of the curved pipe of 355.6 millimetres (14 in) × 12.5 millimetres (0.5 in) was achieved by filling it with pumpable, high-strength lightweight concrete. The bridge has a longitudinal gradient of 5.4 %.

== History ==
The canal was created from 1856 on the initiative of the Leipzig lawyer and industrial pioneer Karl Heine (1819-1888) as the first part of a projected shipping canal from the White Elster to the Saale river. Canal construction began in Plagwitz at the White Elster. The first section of the canal was inaugurated on 25 June 1864, and in 1887 the Leipzig-Probstzella railway was reached in Lindenau. Between 1890 and 1898 the last section was built, which ended just before the Lindenau harbor.

The canal was renovated in the 1990s. A pedestrian/bicycle path was created on the northern bank of the canal, which was inaugurated on 16 September 1996 in the presence of the then Federal Minister for the Environment, Angela Merkel.

In 2007, the city administration decided to commission the necessary planning for the extension of the canal to the port in order to enable the connection that had been planned for some time.

On 18 July 2012, the city council decided to extend the canal to the Lindenau port; €18 million were to be invested in the project by 2015, which the city administration planned to have an impact on urban development in the west of Leipzig. The municipality had to contribute about €3.8 million from its own budget, €7.6 million euros would come from property sales on Plautstrasse. The rest of the costs were financed with grants, including from the EU urban development fund "Jessica" (Joint European Support for Sustainable Investment in City Areas, an initiative of the European Investment Bank).

On 29 January 2015, work began with filling the new 665-metre-long (2,200 ft) connection between the Karl Heine Canal and the port of Lindenau. The process was completed as scheduled three weeks later. On 2 July 2015, the new route was opened for boat traffic. Before the next 75-metre-long (250 ft) connection from the port to the Elster-Saale Canal can be established, a barrage to protect against high and low water levels must be built south of the Luisenbrücke.

== See also ==
- Bodies of water in Leipzig

== Literature ==
- Diana Pöschel, Helga Schmidt (2005). "Canale Nostalghia - Karl-Heine-Kanal". Der Leipzig Atlas (in German). Herrmann-Josef Emons Verlag. pp. 136–137. ISBN 3-89705-269-5.
- Ringel, Sebastian (2015). "Taming the West". Leipzig! One Thousand Years of History. Leipzig: Author and Edition Leipzig in the Seemann Henschel GmbH & Co. KG. p. 88-91. ISBN 978-3-361-00710-9.
