= Karl-Heine-Strasse =

Street in Leipzig, Germany

Coordinates: 51.33237°N 12.33879°E

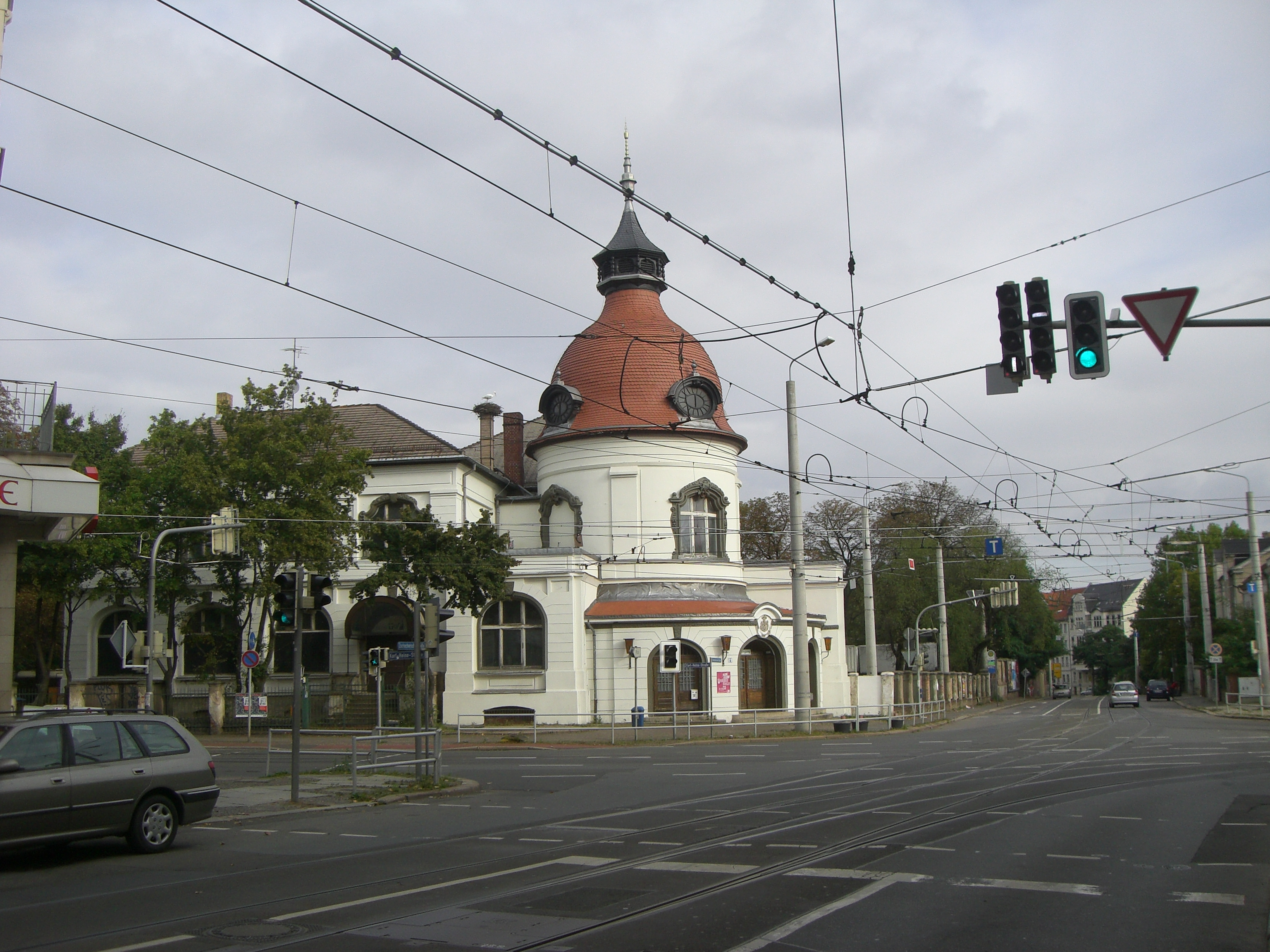
- Felsenkeller at the crossroads between Zschochersche Strasse and Karl-Heine-Strasse
- Interactive map of Karl-Heine-Strasse
- Former names: Leipziger Allee (around 1860), Leipziger Strasse, Albertstrasse (1881)
- Length: 2,010 m (6,590 ft)
- Location: Plagwitz, Lindenau, Leipzig, Germany
- Postal code: 04229
- Nearest metro station: Leipzig-Plagwitz station of S-Bahn Mitteldeutschland and tram
- East: Saalfelder Strasse
- West: Käthe-Kollwitz-Strasse

Construction
- Completed: Mid 19th century

Karl-Heine-Strasse is a radial road in the west of Leipzig marking the boundary between the current localities of Leipzig-Plagwitz (to the south) and Leipzig-Lindenau (to the north). 2.01 km (1.2 mi) long, it is named after the industrialist Karl Heine.

== Odonymy ==
The eastern part of the road between Karl-Heine-Platz and the Plagwitzer Brücke (Litt.: Plagwitz Bridge) over the White Elster was first named Leipziger Allee (Litt.: Leipzig Avenue), then later renamed Leipziger Strasse, perhaps as a result of the Franco-Prussian War of 1870 and the desire to defrancize street names (Allee is a German term borrowed from French). The section between Karl-Heine-Platz and Giesserstrasse is built on the route of the former Via Regia, which came via Felsenkellerstrasse and led (through the current building at Karl-Heine-Strasse 103) to Alte Salzstrasse. This section of track, then the entire current western part of the street when it was extended, was called Albertstrasse, just like the Albertbrücke (Litt.: Albert Bridge) over the Karl Heine Canal, in honor of King Albert of Saxony. The street was renamed Karl-Heine-Strasse at the end of the 19th century.

== History ==
The eastern section between Plagwitzer Brücke and Karl-Heine-Platz was laid out in the second half of the 19th century and was mostly built with villas, most of which still exist today. In the subsequent section, in addition to closed-construction residential buildings, industrial buildings were also built.

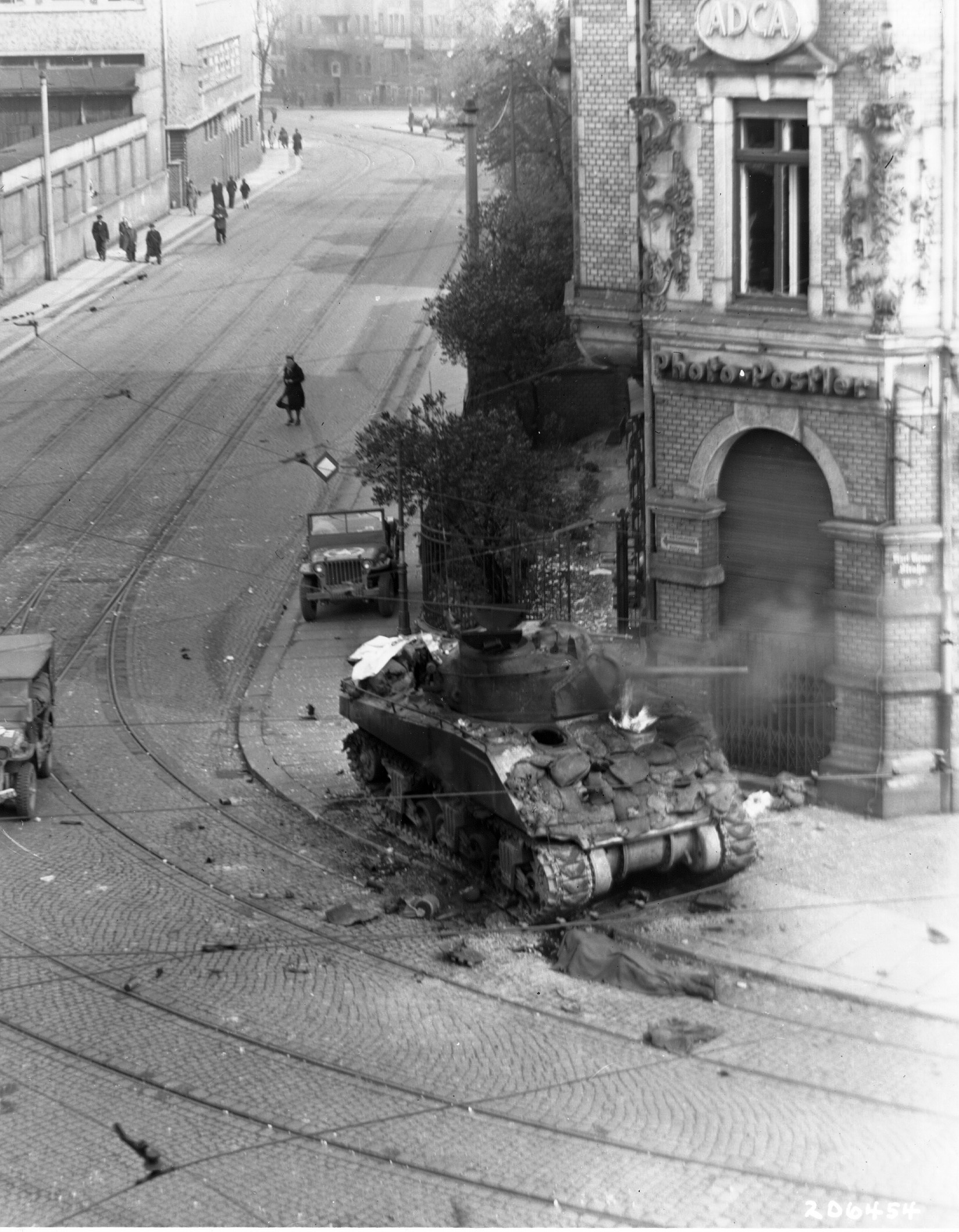
Burning tank of the 2nd US Infantry Division on 18 April 1945 at the intersection at Felsenkeller

On 4 June 1872, a horsecar coming from Leipzig in the east ran for the first time to today's Felsenkeller and in July 1882 to the depot with horse stables near today's Westwerk. In 1896 the line was switched to electric operation and the line was extended to Plagwitz train station.

For almost 30 years, Michaelis-Max Joske ran two department stores in Leipzig, one on Windmühlenstrasse and a smaller one on Karl-Heine-Strasse 43–45. The Nazi boycott of Jewish businesses in April 1933 drove him to ruin.

Even though there was brief resistance on 18 April 1945 when the US Army advanced and a US tank caught fire, the development on the road suffered little damage during the Second World War.

After 1990, most of the buildings on the street were renovated.

== Meeting place ==
Today, the middle section from the crossroads with Zschochersche Strasse to the King-Albert-Bridge contains numerous restaurants and is a diverse meeting place where parts of Leipzig's nightlife takes place.

== Notable buildings ==
=== Karl-Heine-Strasse 12, Villa Sack ===
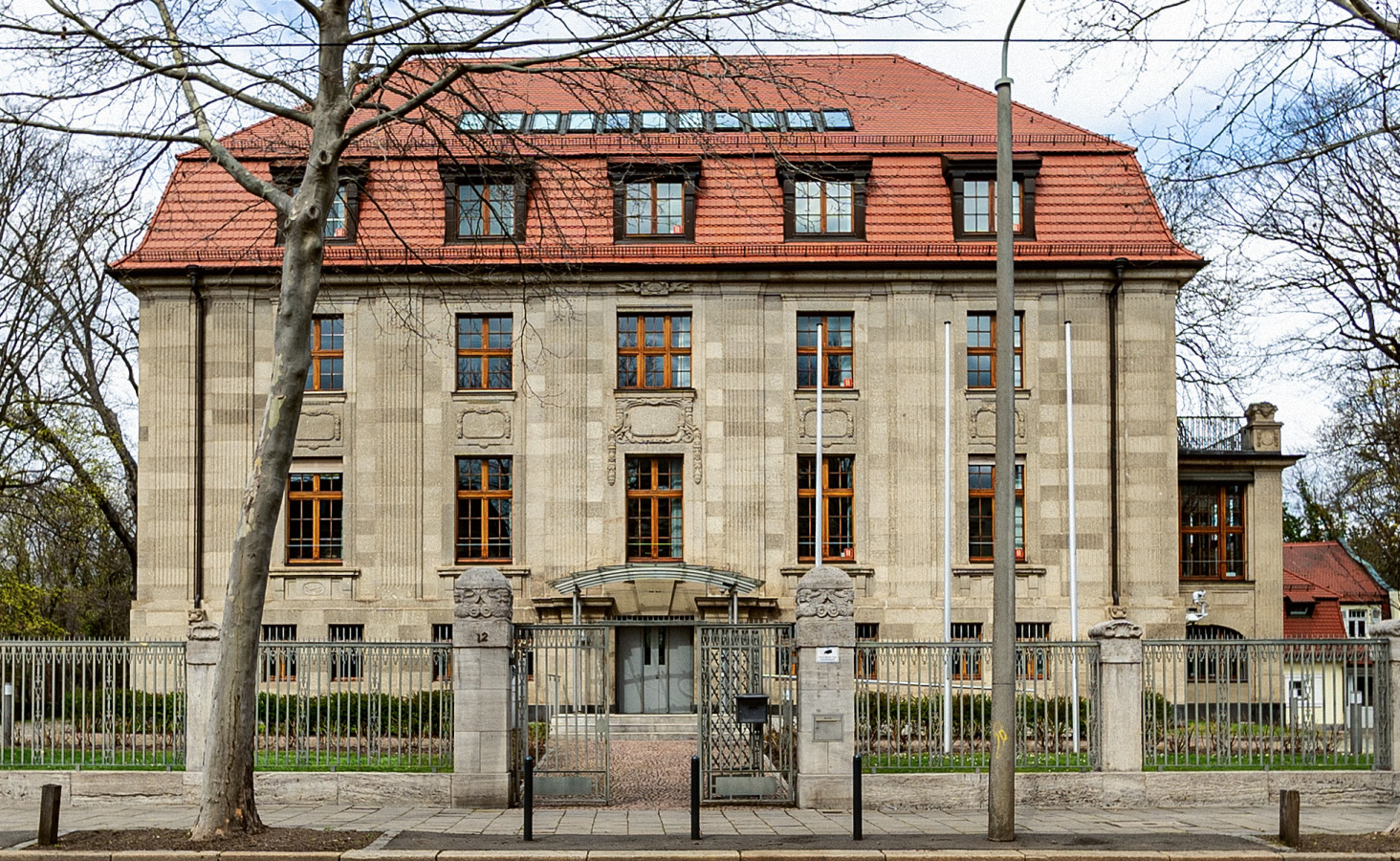
The Villa Sack

The Villa Sack is a free-standing building set back from the street. Built in the neo-baroque style in 1909, it was for more than 20 years the prestigious family seat of agricultural machinery manufacturer Gustav Rudolph Friedrich Sack. Currently it is the office for three divisions responsible for criminal matters of the Federal Court of Justice.

=== Karl-Heine-Strasse 22b, Schule am Palmengarten ===
An iron gate at the street adverts a school by an inscription reminding of the peintor and sculptor Max Klinger which was built in 1927/28 according the concepts of Hubert Ritter and Max Baumeister in the style of Neues Bauen. It is accessible via a bridge over the water course of the Kleine Luppe. After a renovation according to the guidelines for historical monuments it was reopened in 2021 under the name Schule am Palmengarten (litt.: School at the Palmengarten). The cost was 41 millions of Euro.

=== Karl-Heine-Strasse 24b, Wagner-Nietzsche Villa ===
The Wagner-Nietzsche Villa is a residential building also from the beginning of the 20th century. The name came about because of the architectural decoration, which refers to the works The Ring Of The Nibelung by Richard Wagner (1813–1883) and Thus Spoke Zarathustra by Friedrich Nietzsche (1844–1900).

=== Karl-Heine-Strasse 32, Felsenkeller ===
The Felsenkeller (litt.: rock cellar) is a performance hall where concerts, public readings and other cultural events take place. The neo-baroque building was built in 1890 according to plans by the architects August Hermann Schmidt (1858–1942) and Arthur Johlige (1857–1937). It then replaced the first Felsenkeller which was located a little further north. The complex included a ballroom and concert hall with a capacity of 1,000 seats, as well as an open-air cinema, veranda, terrace and garden. The large hall served as a rallying and meeting point in the labor and communist movement. Protagonists such as Karl Liebknecht, Rosa Luxemburg, Clara Zetkin and Ernst Thälmann spoke there. The building was not damaged during World War II. In 1946, the Leipzig branch of Free German Youth was founded there. In the early 1980s and then in 2005, the building was renovated.

=== Karl-Heine-Strasse 50, Schaubühne Lindenfels ===
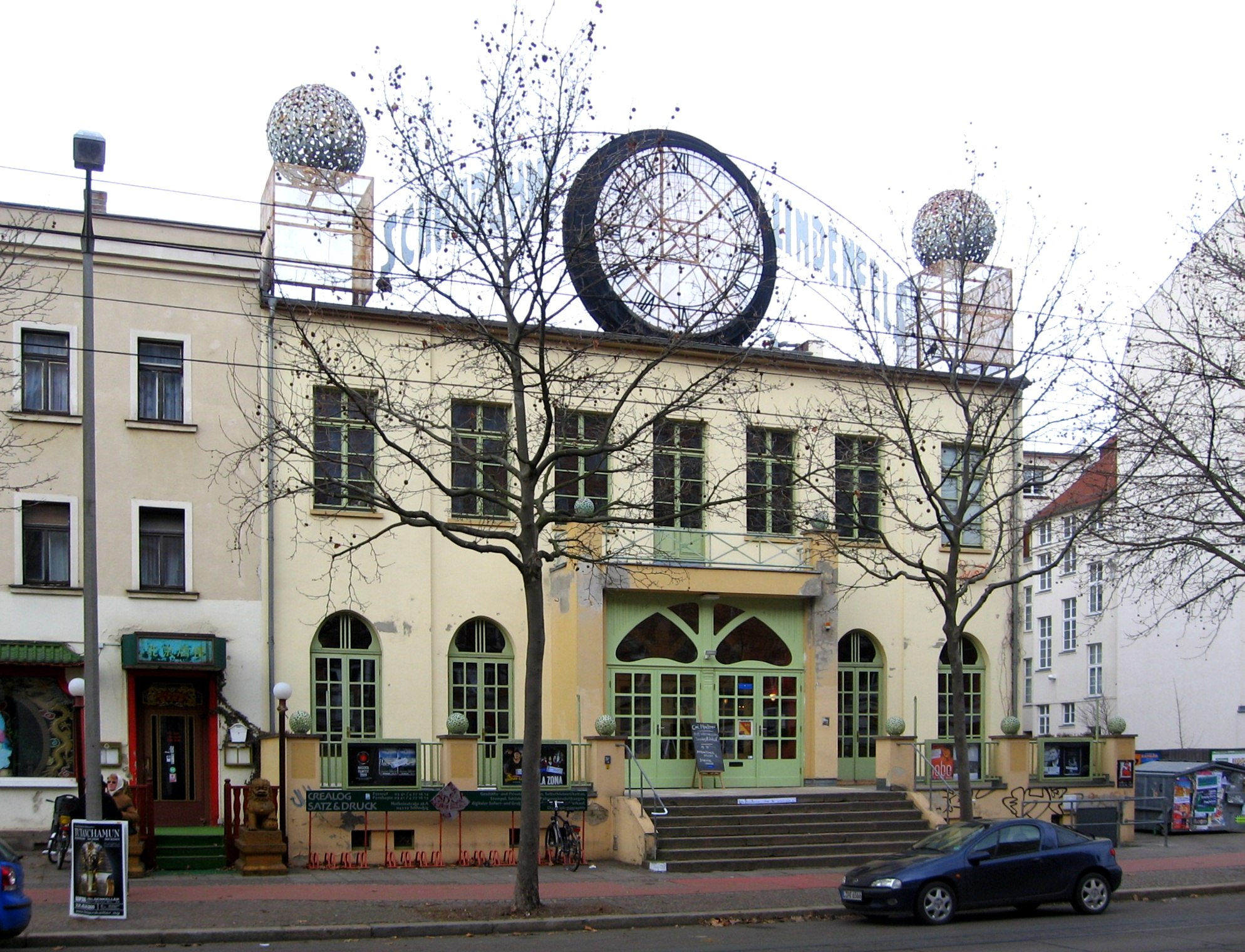
The Schaubühne

The Schaubühne Lindenfels (litt.: Lindenfels performance stage) consists of a former ballroom where plays and concerts are staged, as well as a café-restaurant, and the Grüne Salon (litt.: green room) used as an arthouse cinema.

It was in 1876 that the mason Carl Schmidt, already the owner of a neighboring restaurant, built a ballroom of the name in this location in the space of three months. It was enlarged by Theodor Wezel in 1892 and bought in a court auction by the brewer Otto Besser. He named the premises Schloss Lindenfels (“Lindenfels Castle”). Lindenfels Castle was one of the most important establishments in Leipzig at the time. From 1906, films were shown there.

The performance hall was emptied in the 1940s and no more performances took place there. In 1943, part of the building was sold for a sheet metal and stove pipe manufacturing factory, the Fröhlich Fabrik. In 1949, the building became home of a Volkseigener Betrieb and the place was renovated. From 1956 to 1987, the building served as a cinema named Lichtspieltheater Lindenfels. A boiler problem in 1987 led to the closure of cinema.

In 1993, a team of actors of the Jena theater decided to buy the premises to turn it into a multi-purpose entertainment venue, including a concert hall, a theater and an art house cinema. Director Volker Schlöndorff premiered his films there. Nina Hagen and Funny van Dannen gave concerts there. Wladimir Kaminer organizes a “Russian disco” (Russendisco) there.

=== Karl-Heine-Strasse 87-93, Westwerk ===
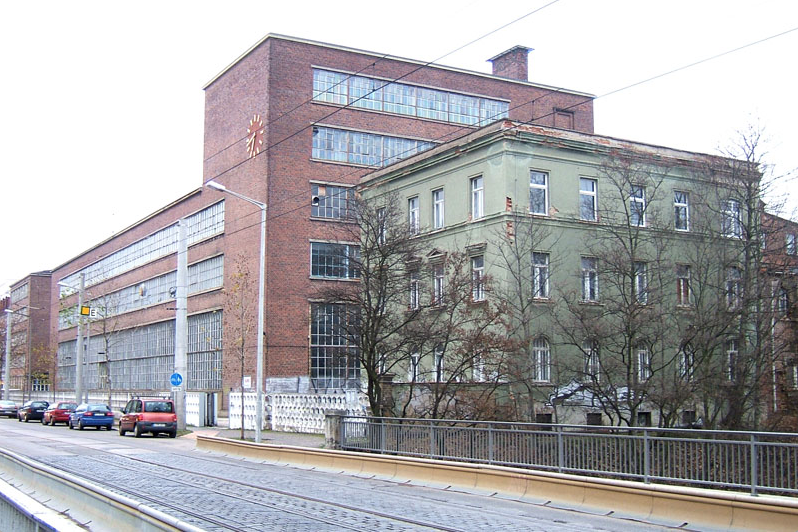
The imposing Westwerk building seen from the King Albert Bridge.

The Westwerk (litt.: factory of the west) is an artists' town in the Neues Bauen architectural style. It has a surface area of 16,000 m^{2} (172,222.6 sq ft) over which the workshops are distributed. The building is rented by the artists' association ars*avanti 6 to Westwerk Logistics GmbH, owned by the industrial engineer Christian Voigt living in Starnberg.

It was originally a foundry built in 1874 by Kaspar Dambacher. The company Schumacher & Koppe set up a steel foundry there in 1882. Max Klinger worked artistically there in a machine shed.

In 2017, an announcement from the owner that part of the premises would be sold for commercial purposes, notably to establish a supermarket, caused a stir among artists. In February 2017, 1,000 people demonstrated to “save Westwerk”.

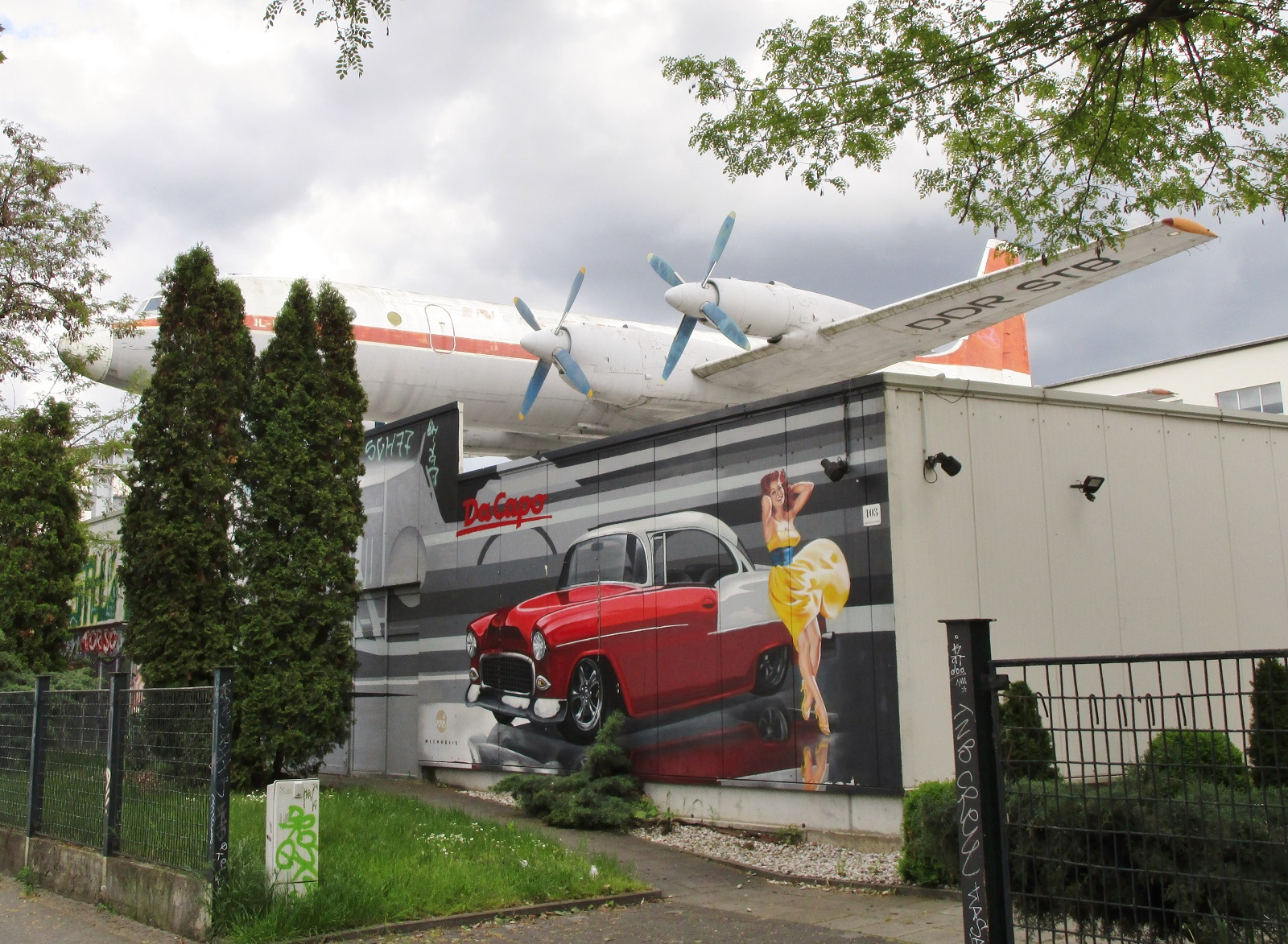
Airplane on the roof

=== Karl-Heine-Strasse 103 / 105 ===
Eye-catching is the airplane of the type Ilyushin Il-18 on the roof. It belongs to the »Da Capo Vintage Car Museum & Event Hall«.

=== Karl-Heine-Strasse 112, Liebfrauenkirche ===
The Liebfrauenkirche (Litt.: Church of Our Lady) is a catholic church located at the western end of Karl-Heine-Strasse, between Engertstrasse and the railway line, and was built in a neo-Romanesque style between 1907 and 1908. The adjoining presbytery was built shortly before, between 1905 and 1906. The church has a 45.5 m (149.3 ft) tall bell tower and two towers on the west gable (overlooking the railway) of 33.5 m (109.9 ft) each.

== Streets encountered ==
Karl-Heine-Strasse meets the following streets, in order of increasing number, i.e. towards the west away from the city center ("l" indicates that the street is on the left, “r” on the right):

- Nonnenstrasse (l)
- Kolbestrasse (l)
- Forststrasse (l)
- Alte Strasse (l)
- Erich-Zeigner-Allee
- Zschochersche Strasse
- Birkenstrasse (r)
- Karl-Heine-Platz (r)
- Walter-Heinze-Strasse (l)
- Josephstrasse (l)
- Hähnelstrasse (r)
- Merseburger Strasse
- GutsMuthsstrasse (r)
- Helmholtzstrasse (r)
- Giesserstrasse
- Engertstrasse
- Spinnereistrasse (r)

== Access ==
Tram line 14 follows the track over its entire length. The tram has the following stops: Nonnenstrasse, Felsenkeller, Karl-Heine-/Merseburger Strasse, Karl-Heine-/Giesserstrasse. Tram line 3 which follows Zschochersche Strasse crosses line 14 and has a stop at the Felsenkeller.

== Millennium Field ==
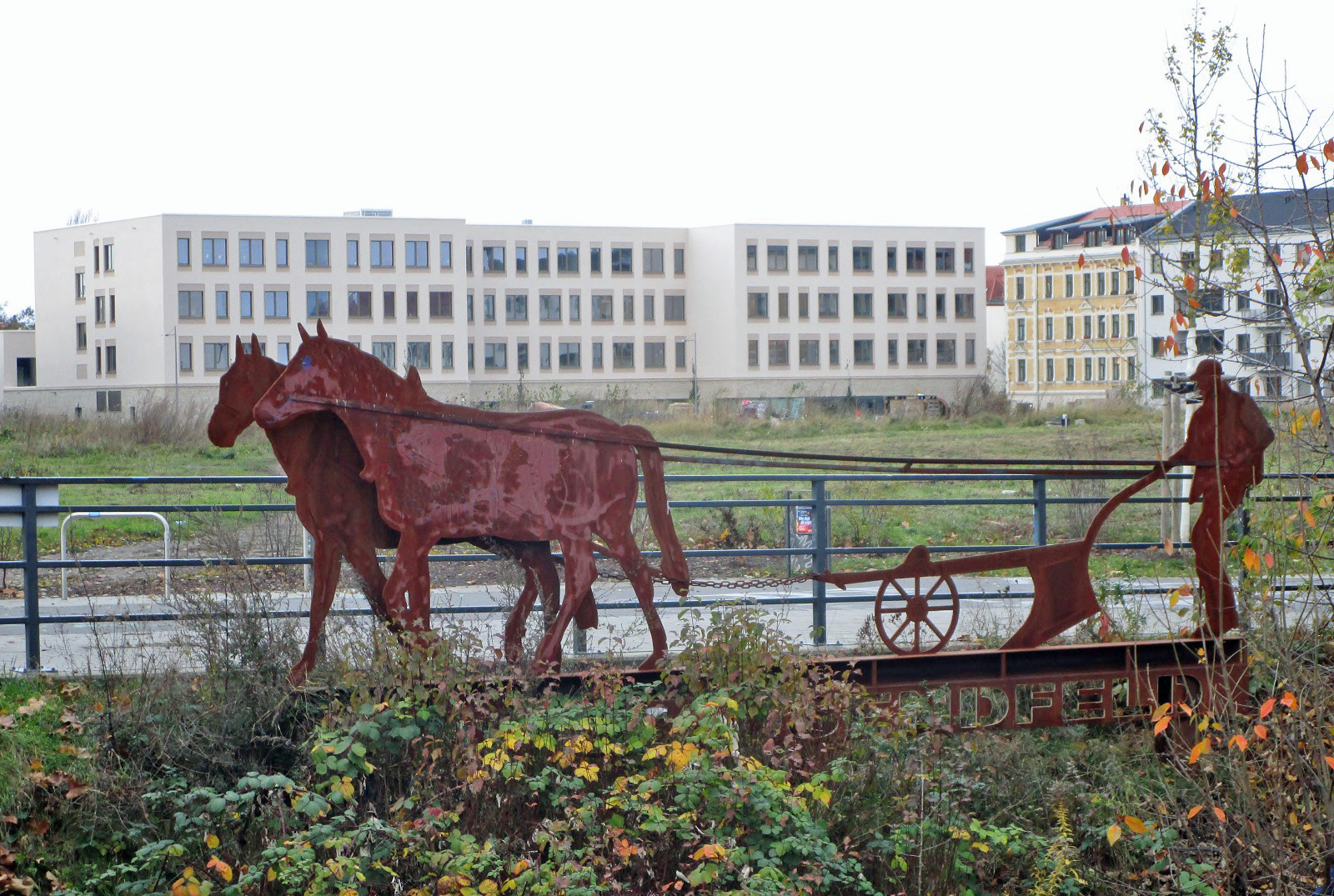
MAN AND HORSES ON MILLENNIUM FIELD

There is a large open space along the northern side of the street between King-Albert-Bridge and Giesserstrasse which is called Jahrtausendfeld (Litt.: millennium field). It was only created in 1999 when the former VEB Bodenbearbeitungsgerätewerk Leipzig (Litt.: soil processing equipment factory), formerly Rudolph Sack agricultural machinery factory, was demolished. On the occasion of Expo 2000 there was an art intervention with disseminating rye which is recalled by the installation ″Man and horses on millennium field″.

== See also ==
- List of streets and squares in Leipzig
