= Plagwitz =

- Stadtteil of Leipzig
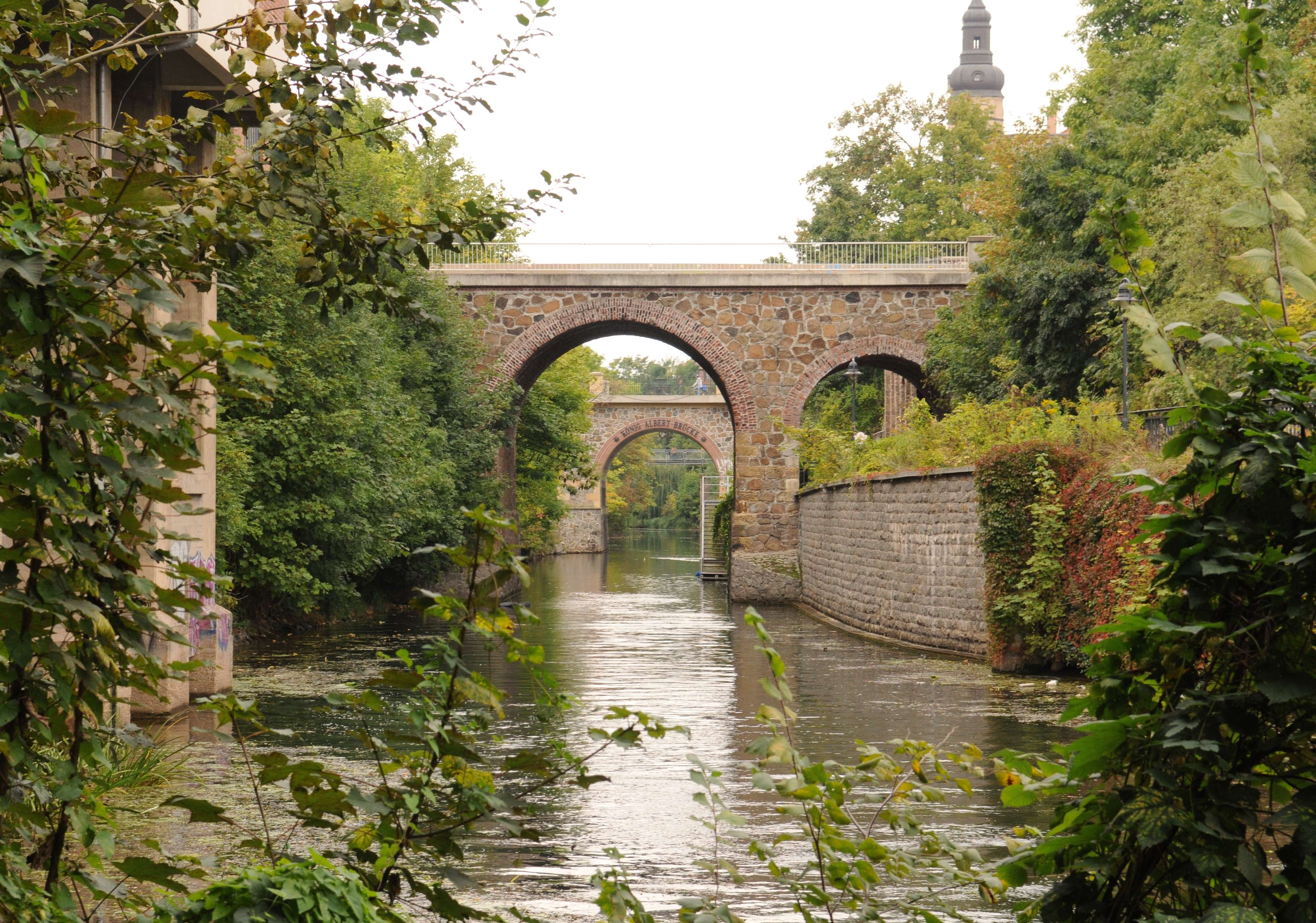
- Interactive map of Plagwitz
- Location within Germany Location within Saxony
- Coordinates: 51°19′35″N 12°20′0″E
- Country: Germany
- State: Saxony
- District: Urban district
- City: Leipzig

Area
  - Total: 1.73 km^{2} (0.67 sq mi)

Population (2024-12-31)
  - Total: 17,209
  - Density: 9,950/km^{2} (25,800/sq mi)
- Time zone: UTC+01:00 (CET)
  - Summer (DST): UTC+02:00 (CEST)
- Postal codes: 04229
- Dialling codes: 0341

Plagwitz (German pronunciation: [ˈplaːkvɪts]) is a western locality of Leipzig in Saxony, Germany. It is part of the borough Südwest.

The former village in Saxony, located 3 km (2 mi) west of Leipzig's city center, was granted the status of a rural municipality in 1839 and was attached to the city of Leipzig in 1891. It was an industrial district during the nineteenth and twentieth centuries – the densest intra-urban industrial site in Europe – until German reunification. After deindustrialization, it developed at the turn of the millennium into a place dedicated to culture and creative industries and a popular residential area.

The Leipzig-Plagwitz railway station served by S-Bahn line 1 and the former Leipzig-Plagwitz Industriebahnhof are located in the locality. One of the main thoroughfares in the district is Karl-Heine-Strasse, which crosses the Karl Heine Canal. The cultural and artistic centre in the former Leipzig cotton mill Leipziger Baumwollspinnerei is also located between the localities of Plagwitz and Lindenau.

== History ==
=== Middle Ages and early modern times ===
The village was founded by Slavic settlers south of the junction of the Kleine Luppe, on the west bank of the White Elster. It was first mentioned in documents as "Plochtewitz" in 1412. The name of the place is derived from the Old Sorbian word Płachtovic, which means something like "settlement on a divided plot of land" (cf. Sorbian płachta = cloth, cloth, veil).

Since the thirteenth century, the sovereigns have been the bishops of Merseburg (until 1562). After the transformation of the diocese into the Episcopal Principality of Merseburg, the Electors of Saxony acted as sovereigns from 1562 to 1656, the Dukes of Saxe-Merseburg from 1656 to 1738, and the Electors (kings since 1806) of Saxony from 1738 to 1918. Both within the monastery of Merseburg and in the Duchy of Saxony-Merseburg, the village of Plagwitz belonged to the district of Lützen. After the cession of most of the diocese of Merseburg to the Kingdom of Prussia following the Treaty of Vienna of 10 January 1815, Plagwitz and the eastern part of the Lützen district that remained in the Kingdom of Saxony became part of the Leipzig district.

The village of Plagwitz belonged to the domain district of the Kleinzschocher manor house (as did the villages of Kleinzschocher, Schleußig and Großmiltitz). Kleinzschocher was also a parish and a school for the Plagwitzers. In 1835, the village consisted of 4 1/8 Magazinhufen, 20 houses and 172 inhabitants.

After the seigniorial regime was replaced in Saxony, Plagwitz was an independent municipality from 1839 to 1890. However, the lower court remained in the Kleinzschocher Patrimonial Court until 1 October 1856.

=== Towards an industrial community ===
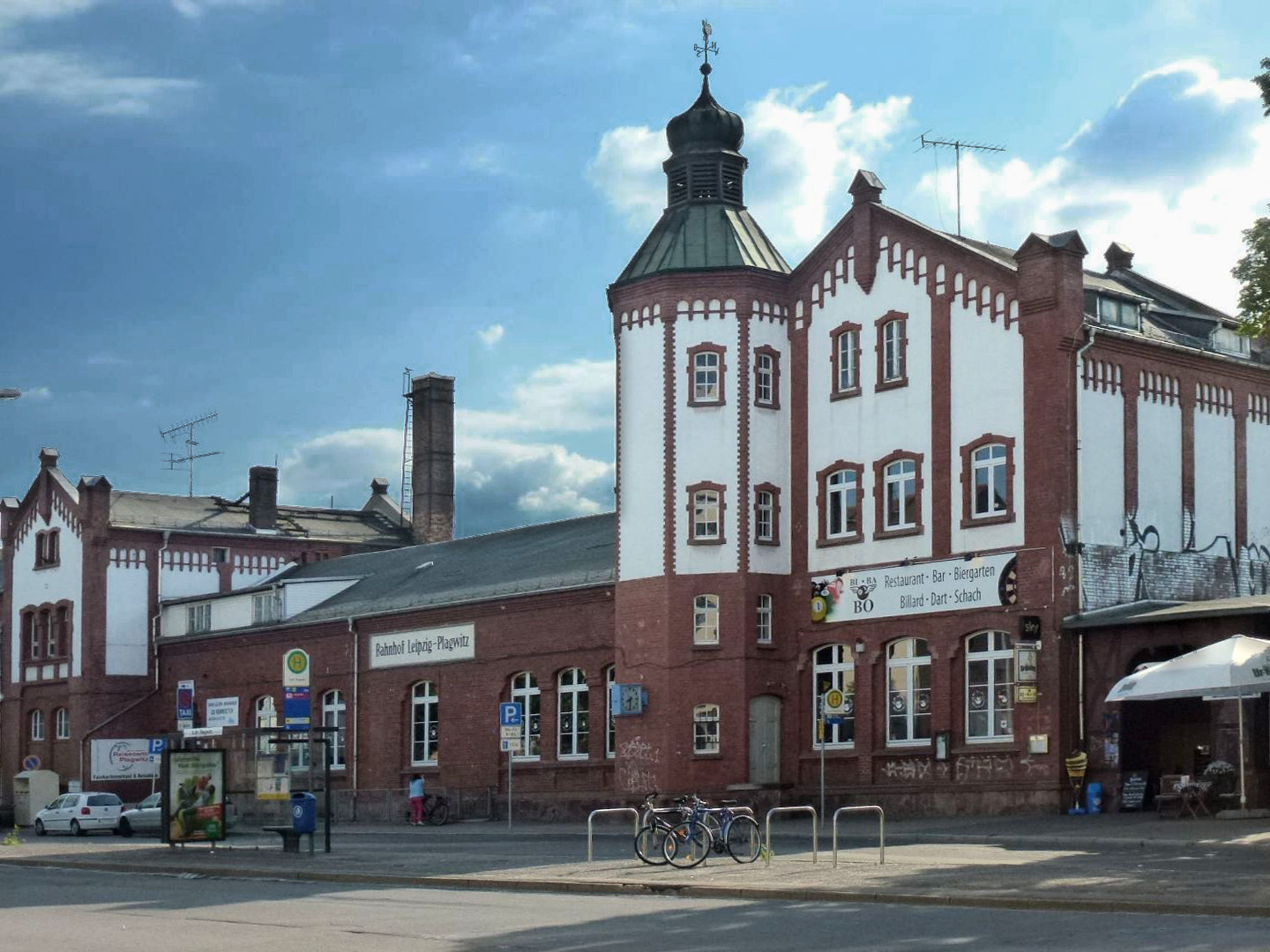
Leipzig-Plagwitz station

In 1854, the Leipzig lawyer Karl Heine (1819-1888) began to buy land in the municipality of Plagwitz in order to use it for the planned establishment of industrial enterprises. New traffic routes were also created under his direction. Of note here is the Elster-Saale Canal, which began in 1856 in a first section that now bears his name as the Karl Heine Canal, as well as the construction of a new bridge over the White Elster and thus a direct connection to Leipzig. The expansion of infrastructure has encouraged the creation of a large number of new factories. Of particular importance were the Rudolph Sack Agricultural Machinery Factory, founded in 1863, and the Mey & Edlich company (production of paper collars, paper cuffs and other fashion items), which had been producing in Plagwitz since 1869.

In 1872, Plagwitz was finally connected to the Leipzig tram network and in 1873 to the German railway network with the opening of the Thuringian Railway Company, initially private, and then the Royal Prussian Railway to Zeitz. In 1879, the railway to Markkleeberg-Gaschwitz was also connected to the Royal Saxon railway network. As a result, a large industrial station was built in Plagwitz as a transfer station between the two railway companies with numerous connecting lines and industrial connections. The wooden bridge in Könneritz over the White Elster, built in 1869, was replaced in 1899 by an iron bridge.

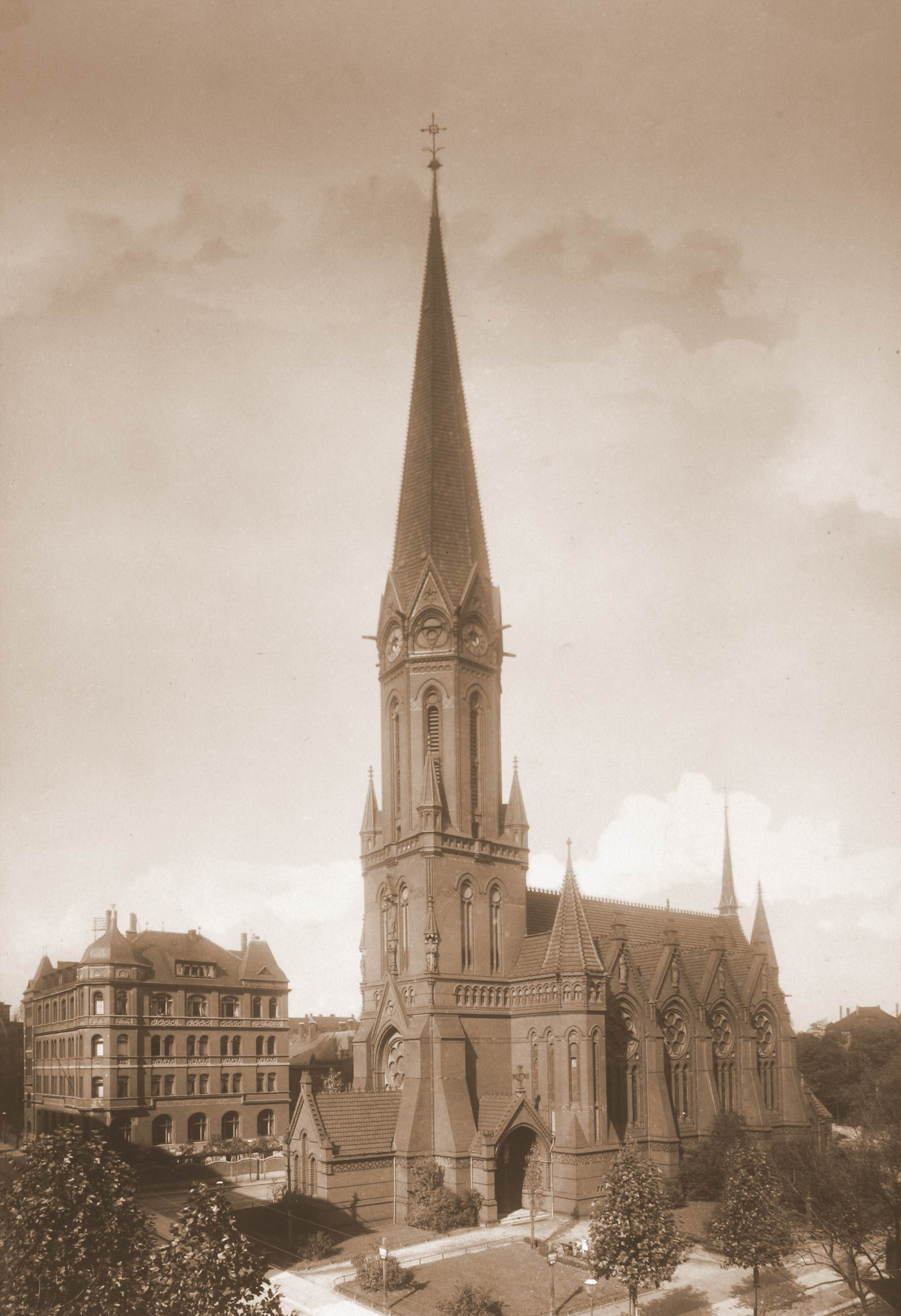
Church of the Saviour (Heilandskirche, c. 1913))

The growing importance of Plagwitz's industry is also reflected in the increase in the number of inhabitants. While the municipality had only 134 inhabitants in 1834, it already had 2,531 in 1871 and 13,045 on the eve of its incorporation into Leipzig in 1890. Due to the increase in population, Plagwitz separated more and more from Kleinzschocher and its own school was opened in 1862. From 1873 to 1890, the rural municipality of Plagwitz belonged to the Leipzig District Administration (Kreishauptmannschaft Leipzig). In 1880, the Plagwitz Cemetery, which still stands today, was built on Stockmannstraße and Alte Salzstraße. The graves of important entrepreneurs and their families are located here, including Hugo Brehmer, Rudolph Sack, and Ernst Mey.

The Plagwitz depot, built in 1881, was the second tram station of the Leipzig Horsecar network. In 1884, the consumer cooperative in Plagwitz and the surrounding area was founded, which became one of the largest consumer cooperatives in Germany and was the forerunner of today's Konsum Leipzig. In 1883/1884, the municipality of Plagwitz built a representative town hall on the former Dorfstraße (now Alte Straße). Diagonally opposite, the neo-Gothic Church of the Saveur (Heilandskirche) was built between 1886 and 1888 for the now independent parish of Plagwitz. After Karl Heine's death in 1888, the Leipzig Westend construction company he founded continued his plans.

=== Plagwitz as part of Leipzig ===
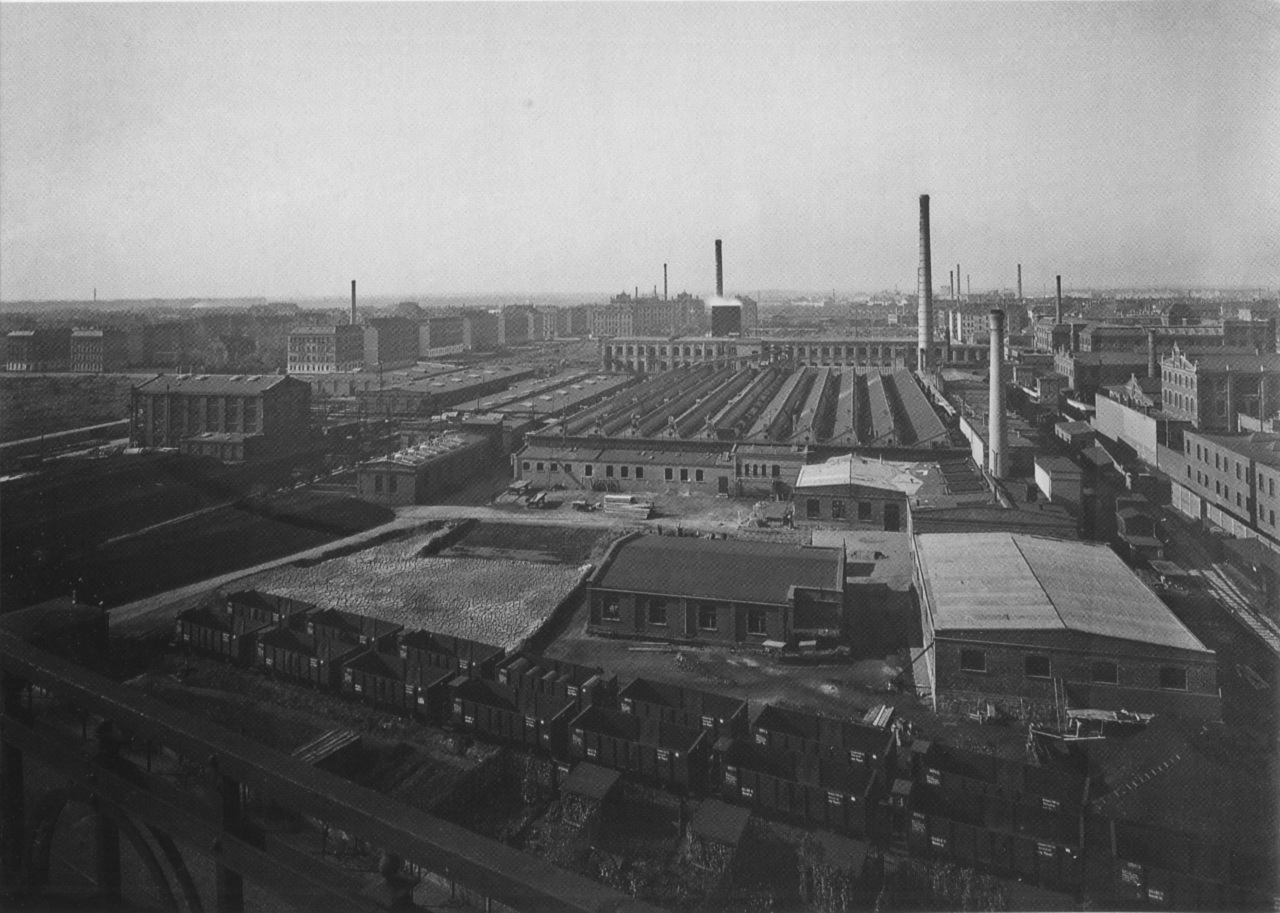
Panorama of the Plagwitz industrial area (between 1918 and 1935)

On 1 January 1891, Plagwitz was incorporated in Leipzig. The work on the Karl Heine Canal was completed in 1893 (but Heine's planned connection to the Saale was not) and the first department store opened in 1900. In 1927, Plagwitz had 18,300 inhabitants. Few new residential and commercial spaces were added between the 1920s and 1940s. However, it is worth highlighting the brick expressionist consum headquarters (Konsumzentrale) built between 1929 and 1932 (Architect: Fritz Höger). During the Second World War, the Plagwitz companies prospered thanks to arms contracts. These armaments factories were partially destroyed during the Bombing of Leipzig in World War II, but there was no widespread destruction at Plagwitz.

After the war, most companies were transformed into public companies (Volkseigener Betrieb). In the planned economy, hardly any investment was made in existing industrial plants and old buildings, so that commercial premises and residential buildings gradually fell into disrepair. The air was polluted by 118 industrial smokestacks per km². Nevertheless, west Leipzig remained the most densely populated industrial location in Europe until the end of the German Democratic Republic. In 1989, there were still about 13,000 industrial jobs in Plagwitz (out of a total of more than 100,000 in Leipzig). After German reunification in 1989/90, a sudden deindustrialization ensued: almost all factories were closed, the number of jobs in industry fell to 1,500 in 1995 and 20 ha (49.4 acres) of brownfield land were created.

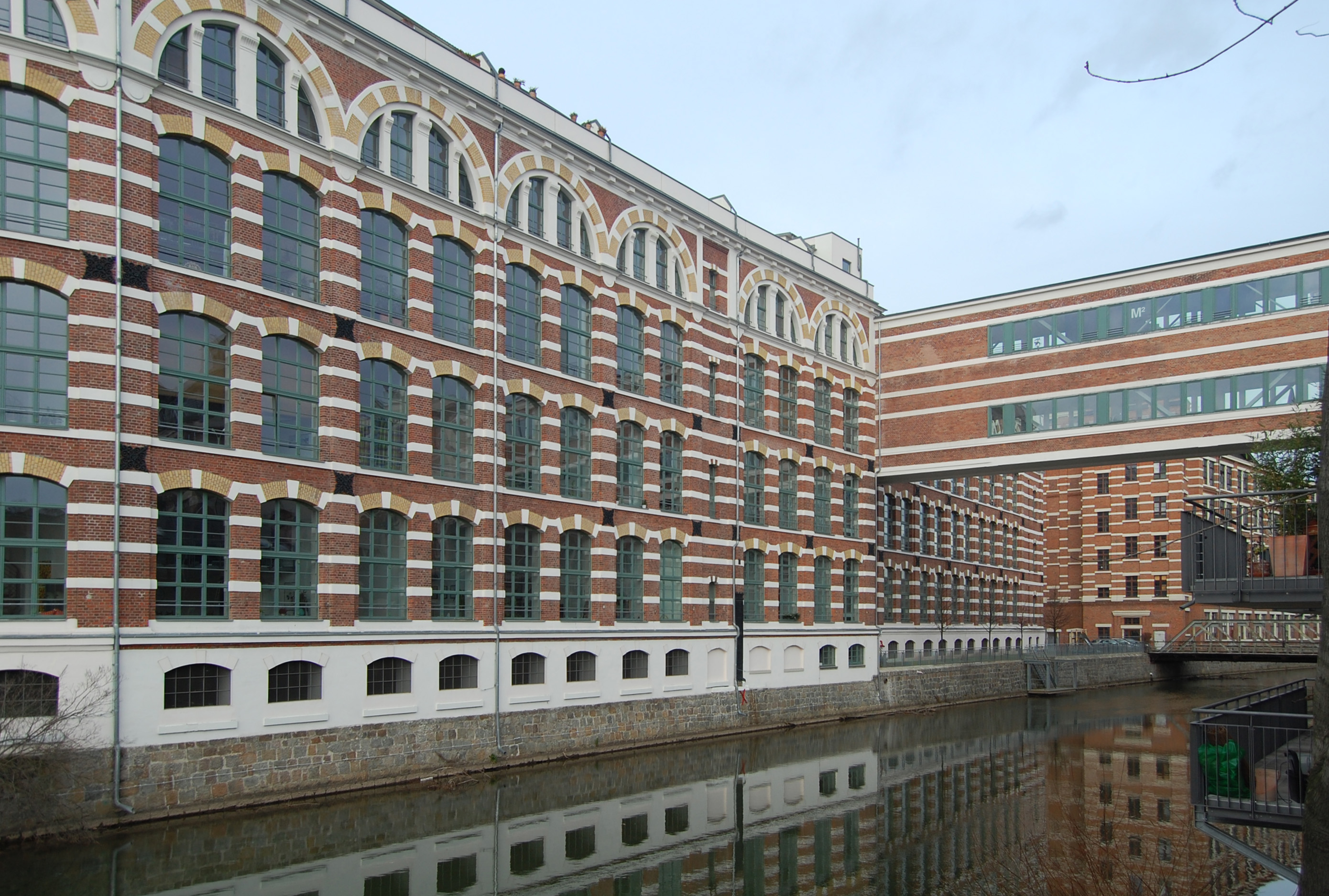
Former Saxon woollen yarn factory, now lofts

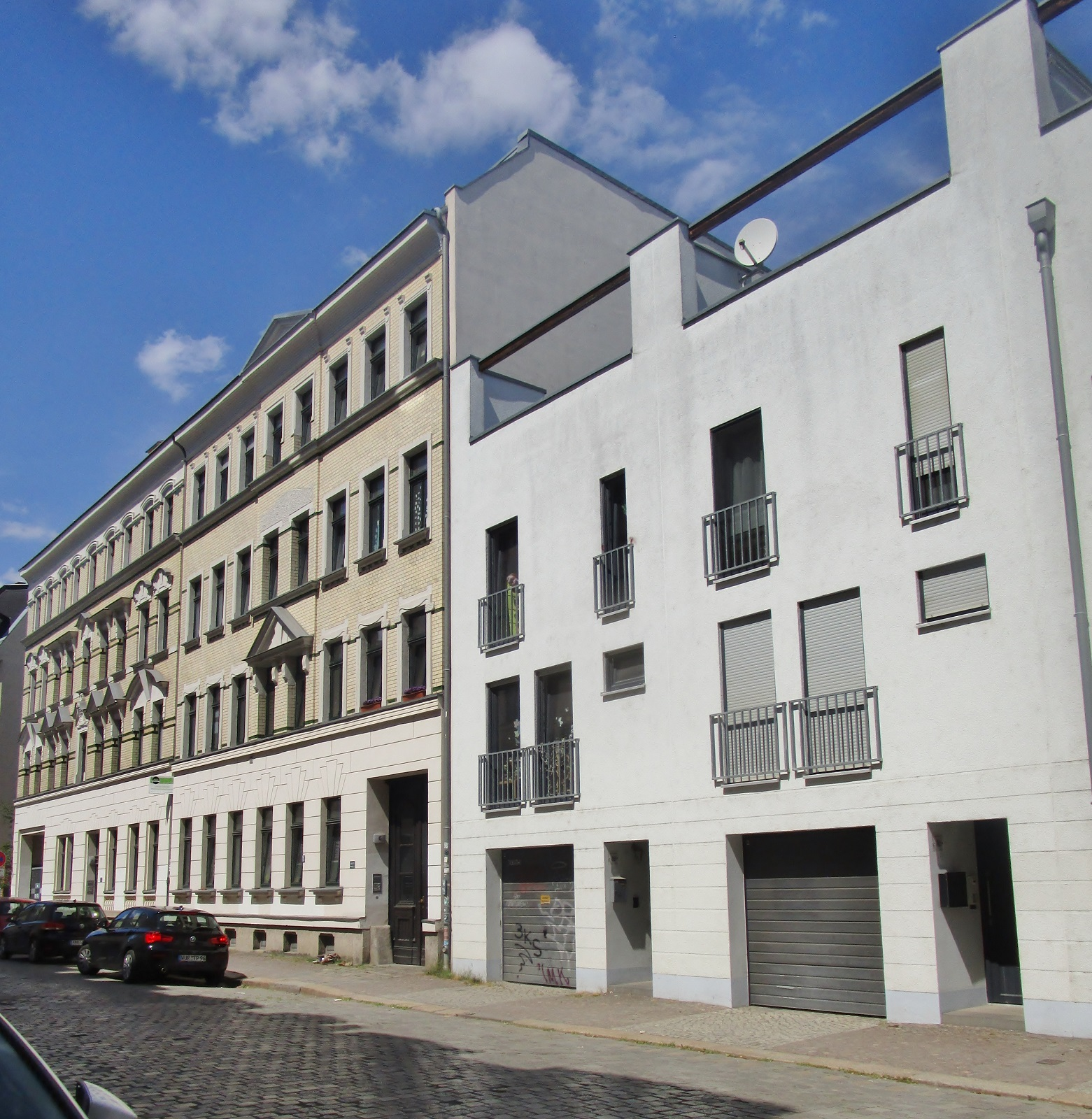
Townhouses on Naumburger Straße

The locality of Plagwitz, created in 1992 as part of the municipal structure of the city of Leipzig for administrative and statistical purposes, corresponds only partially to the area of the former municipality of Plagwitz. After carrying out preparatory studies, municipal council resolutions were adopted in 1994, 1999, 2013, 2018, 2019 and 2021 for an area of up to 86 ha (212.5 acres) in Plagwitz and Lindenau as a redevelopment area. From 1993 to 2020, a total of €22,766,680 in funding from the state of Saxony, the federal government and the European Commission was spent on urban renewal and development measures in this area.

During this period, new commercial areas were built and abandoned industrial buildings were often converted. Terraced houses were built on an abandoned industrial site. In 1997, the 5th Criminal Senate of the Federal Court of Justice moved from Berlin to the Villa Sack in Leipzig-Plagwitz (which is part of the Lindenau locality according to the municipal reorganization). The Saxon wool yarn factory (Sächsische Wollkämmerei) - Germany's largest industrial heritage site - was converted into lofts in 1999.

The project "Plagwitz on the road to the twenty-first century – an example of sustainable urban redevelopment" was presented at Expo 2000. Since that time, Plagwitz has once again become one of the most dynamic and "trendy" localities in Leipzig. Many start-ups and players in the cultural and creative industries have settled here. Since then, a process of gentrification has been observed.

== Population ==
The locality had 16,660 inhabitants in 2021 according to the register of domiciliary declarations, i.e. 9,747 inhabitants/km². Between 2000 and 2019, the population of the Plagwitz locality almost doubled: from 8,534 to 16,297 inhabitants.

Year	Residents
2000	8.534
2005	10.336
2010	12.116
2015	15.067
2020	16.549
2024	17.209

== Architecture ==
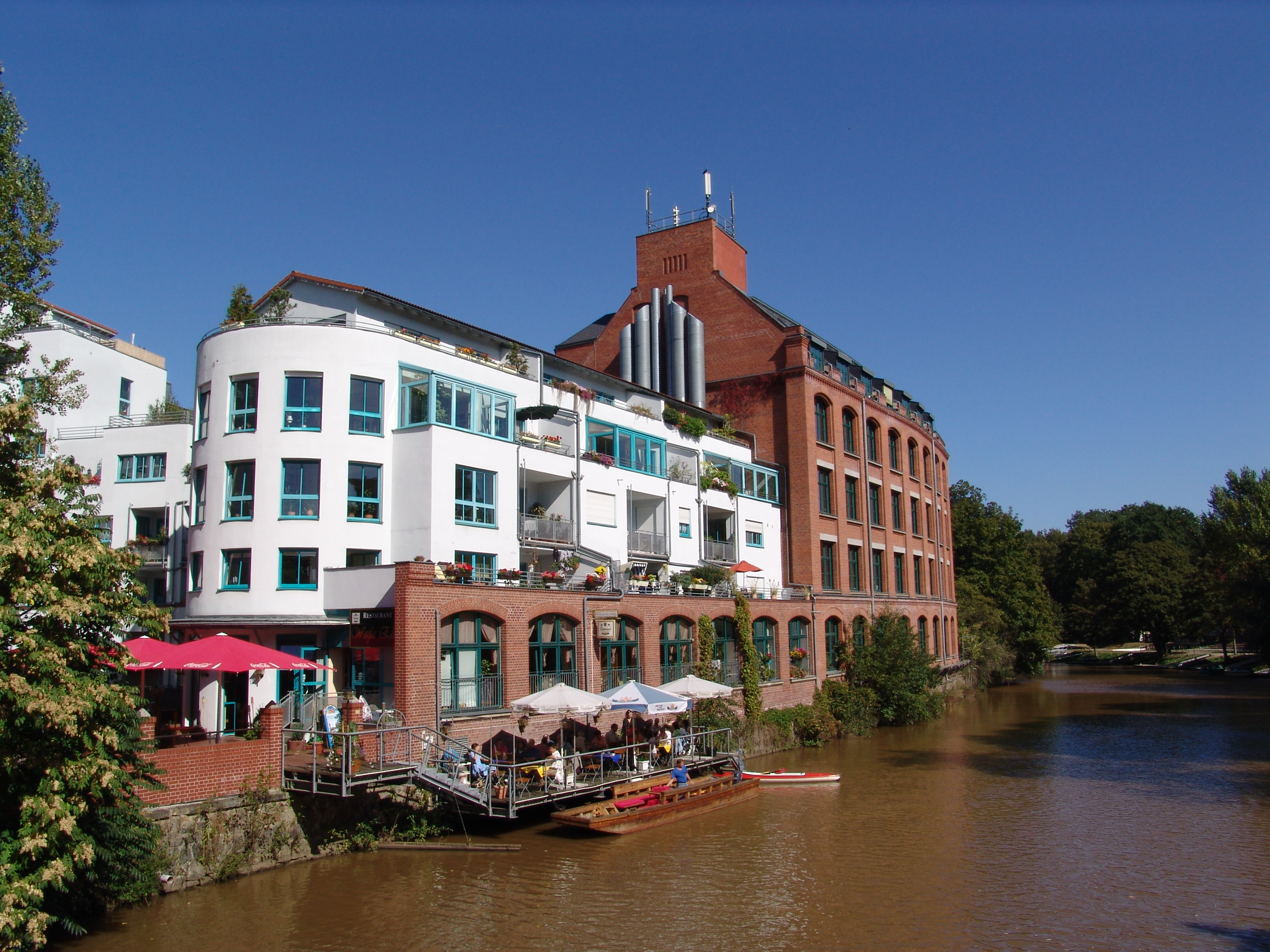
Former Mey & Edlich factory

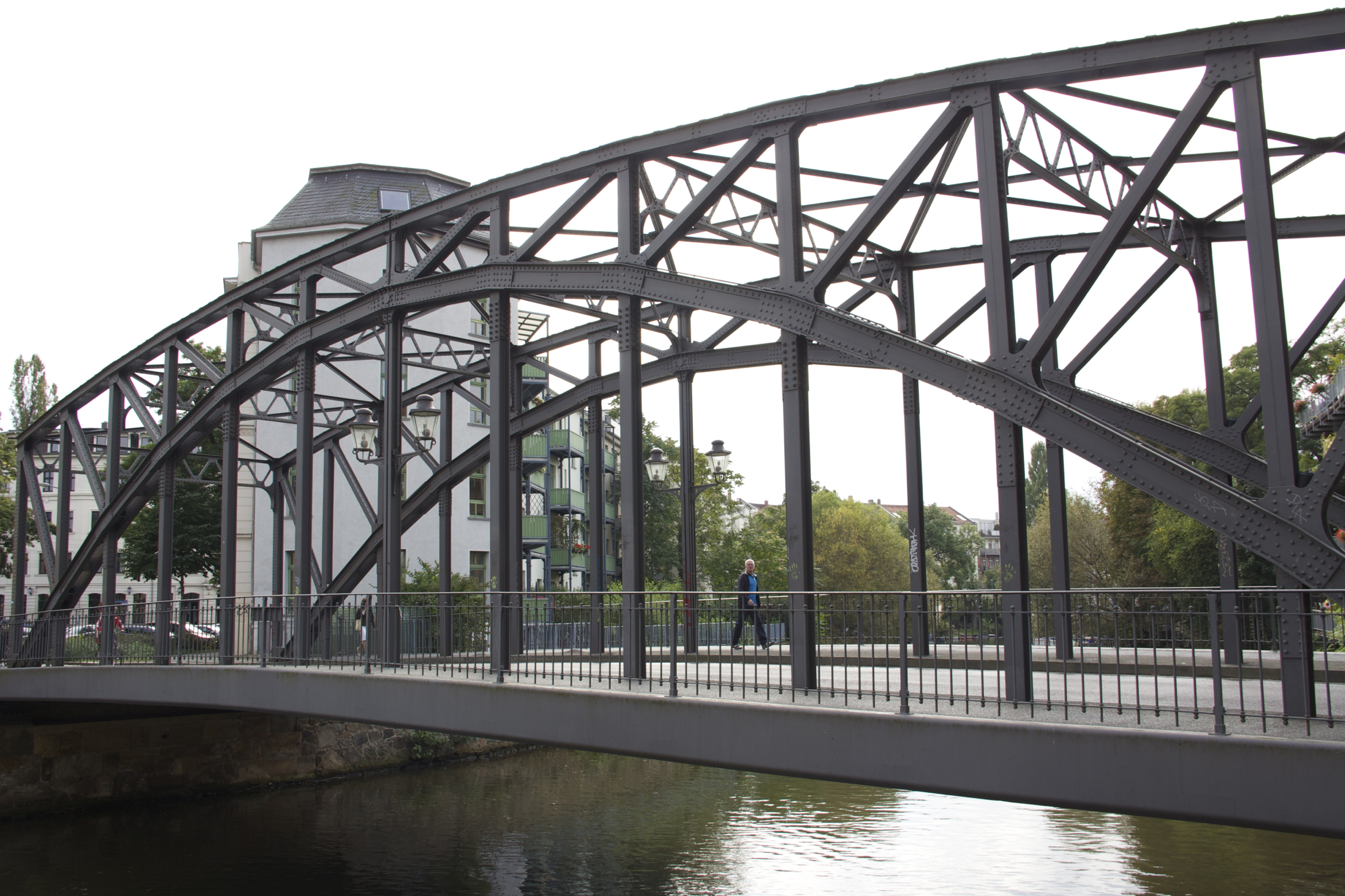
Koenneritz Bridge over the White Elster River

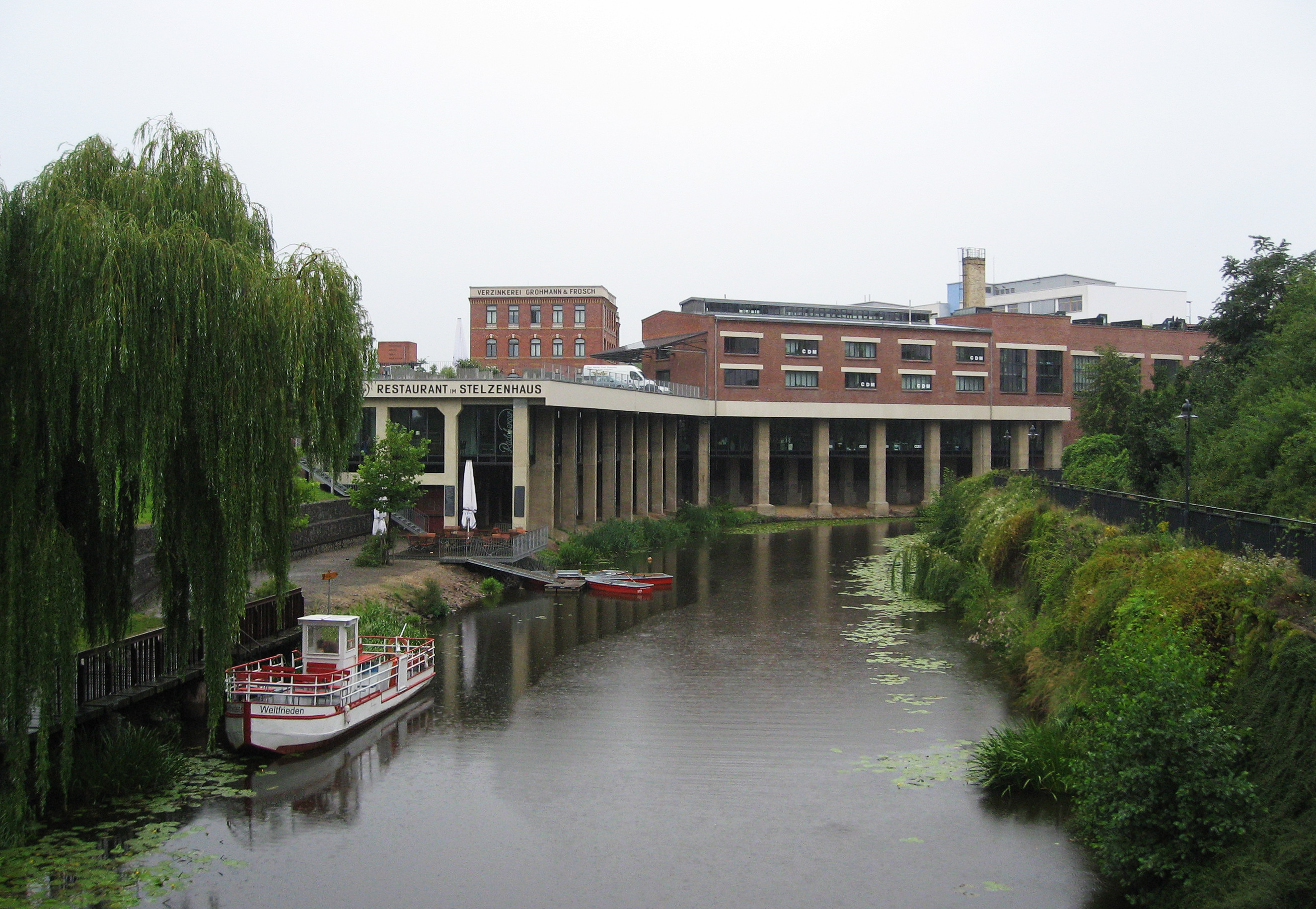
Karl Heine Canal with the Stelzenhaus.

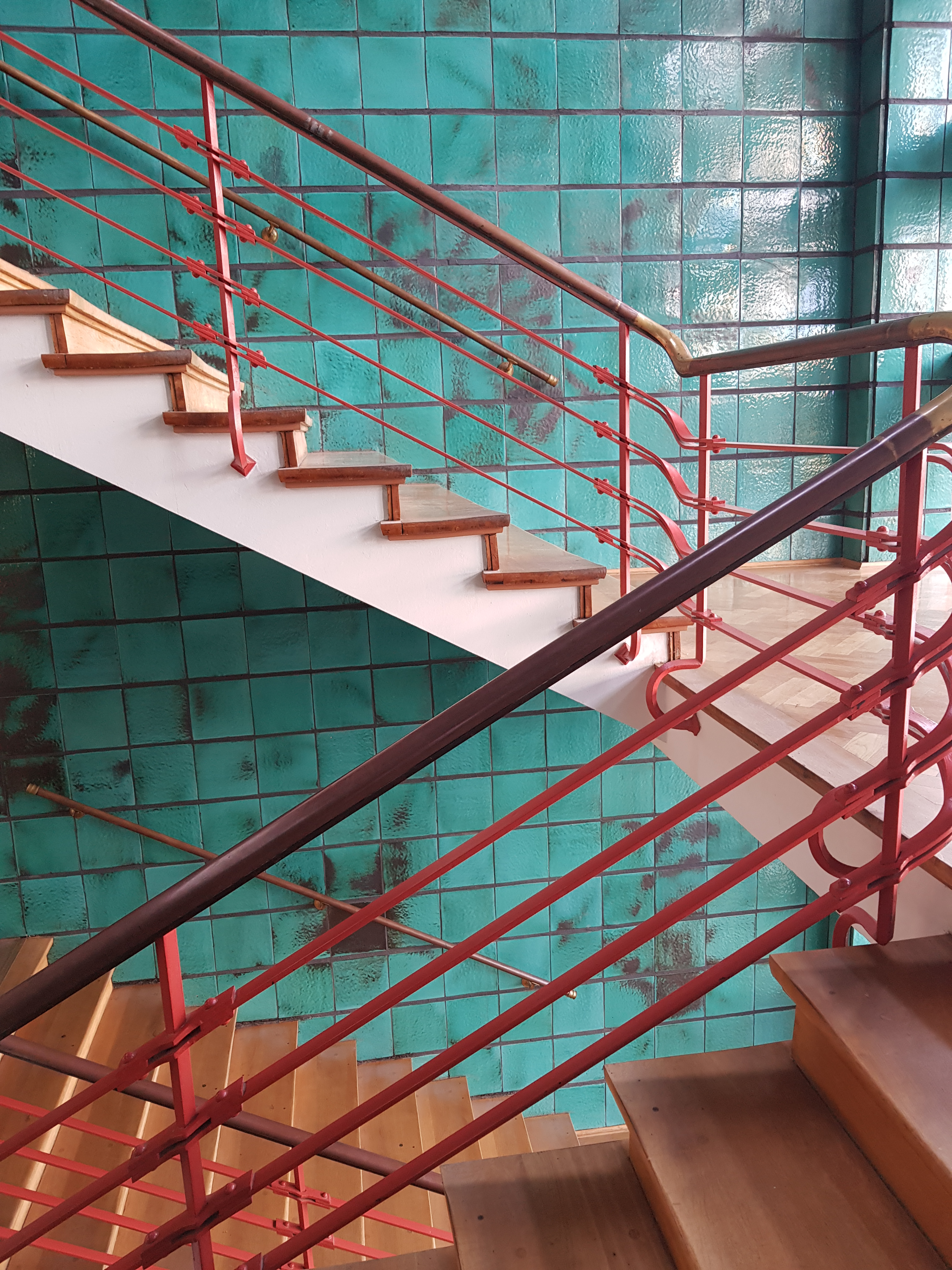
In the center of the consumer cooperative

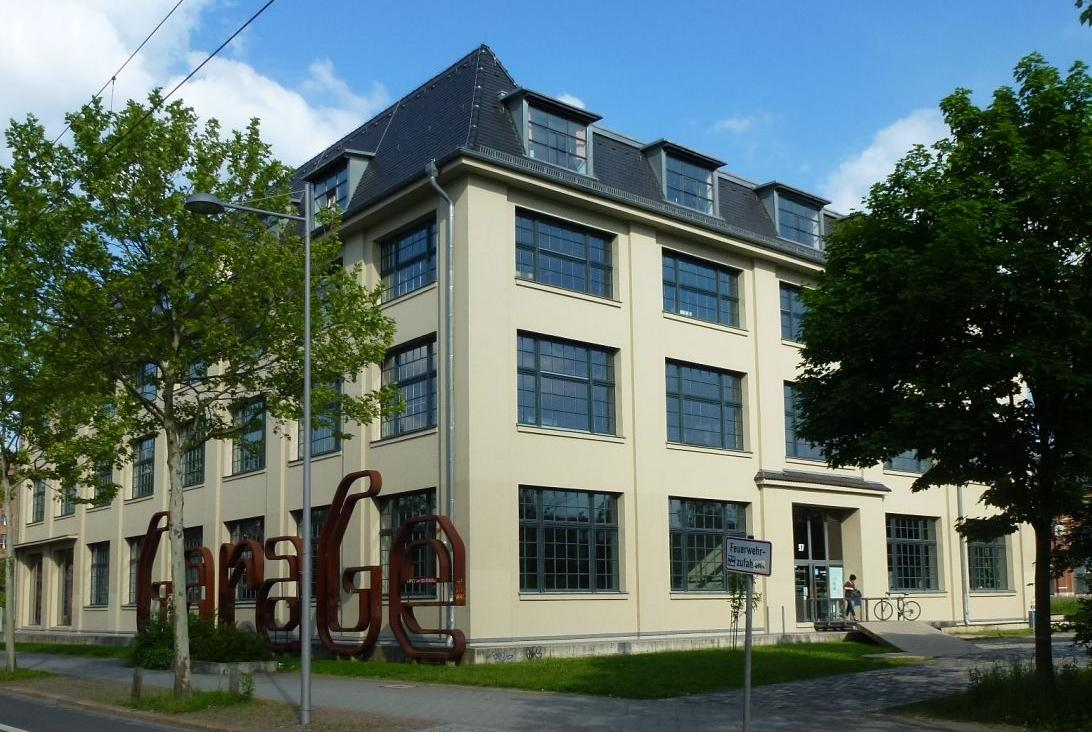
GaraGe Youth Technical Centre

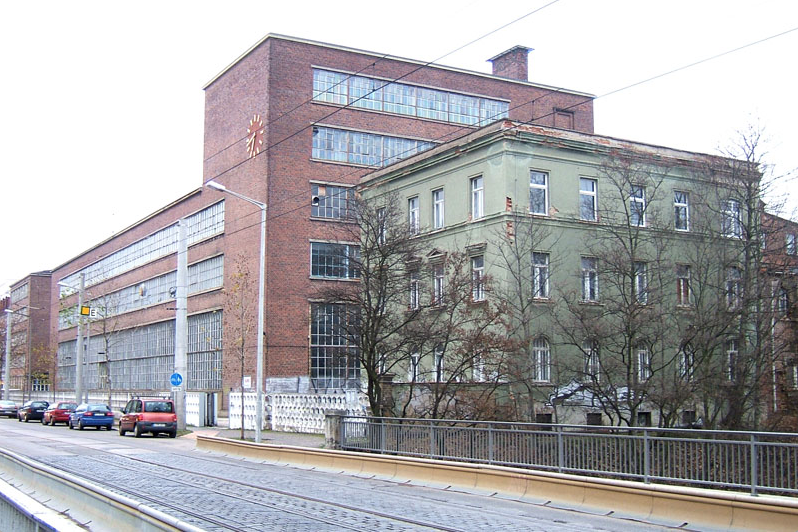
Westwerk Art District

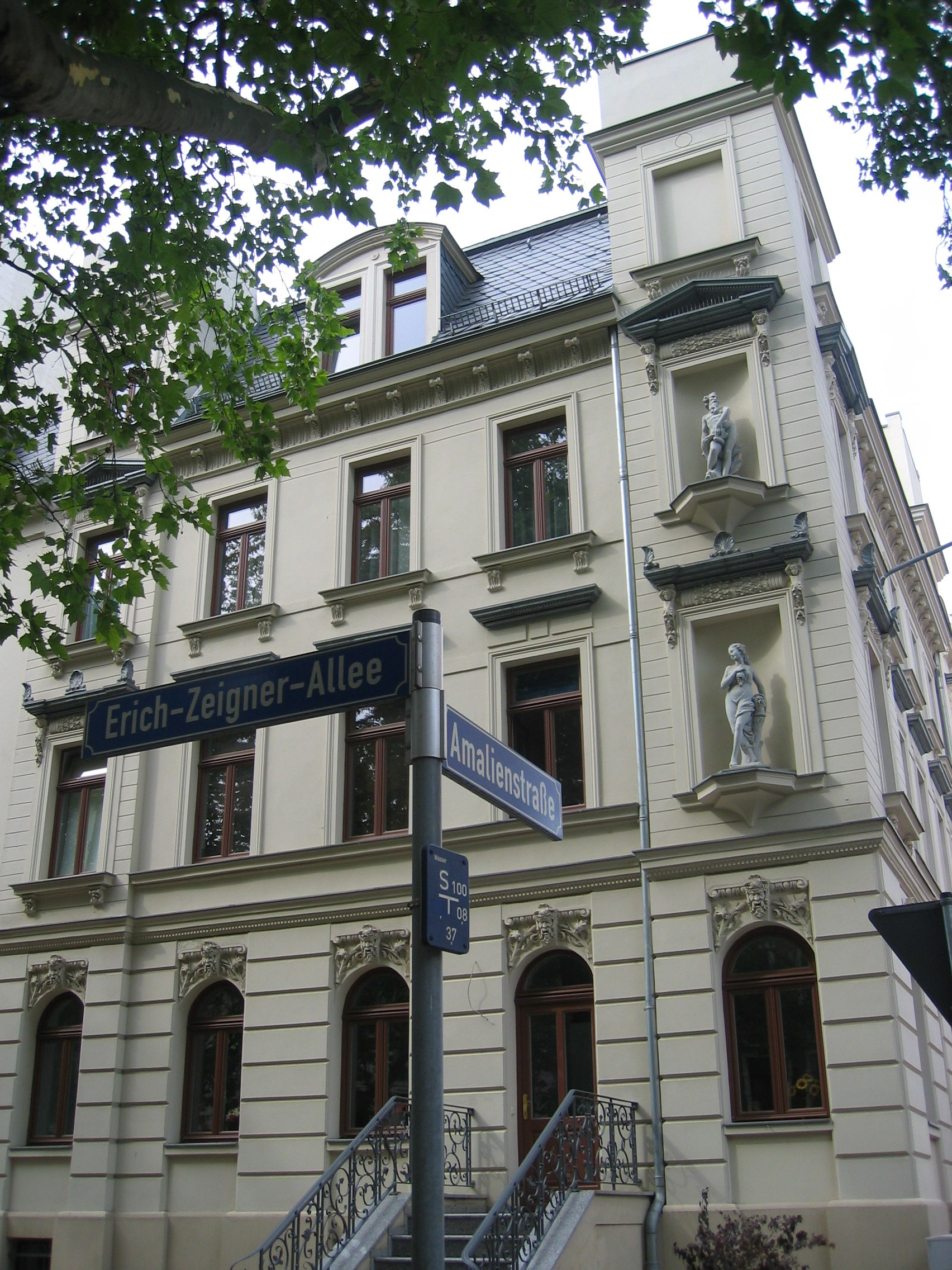
Gründerzeit façade

== Museum ==
In 2010, in Plagwitz opened the Unikatum Children's Museum, Leipzig.

== Neighbourhood Park ==
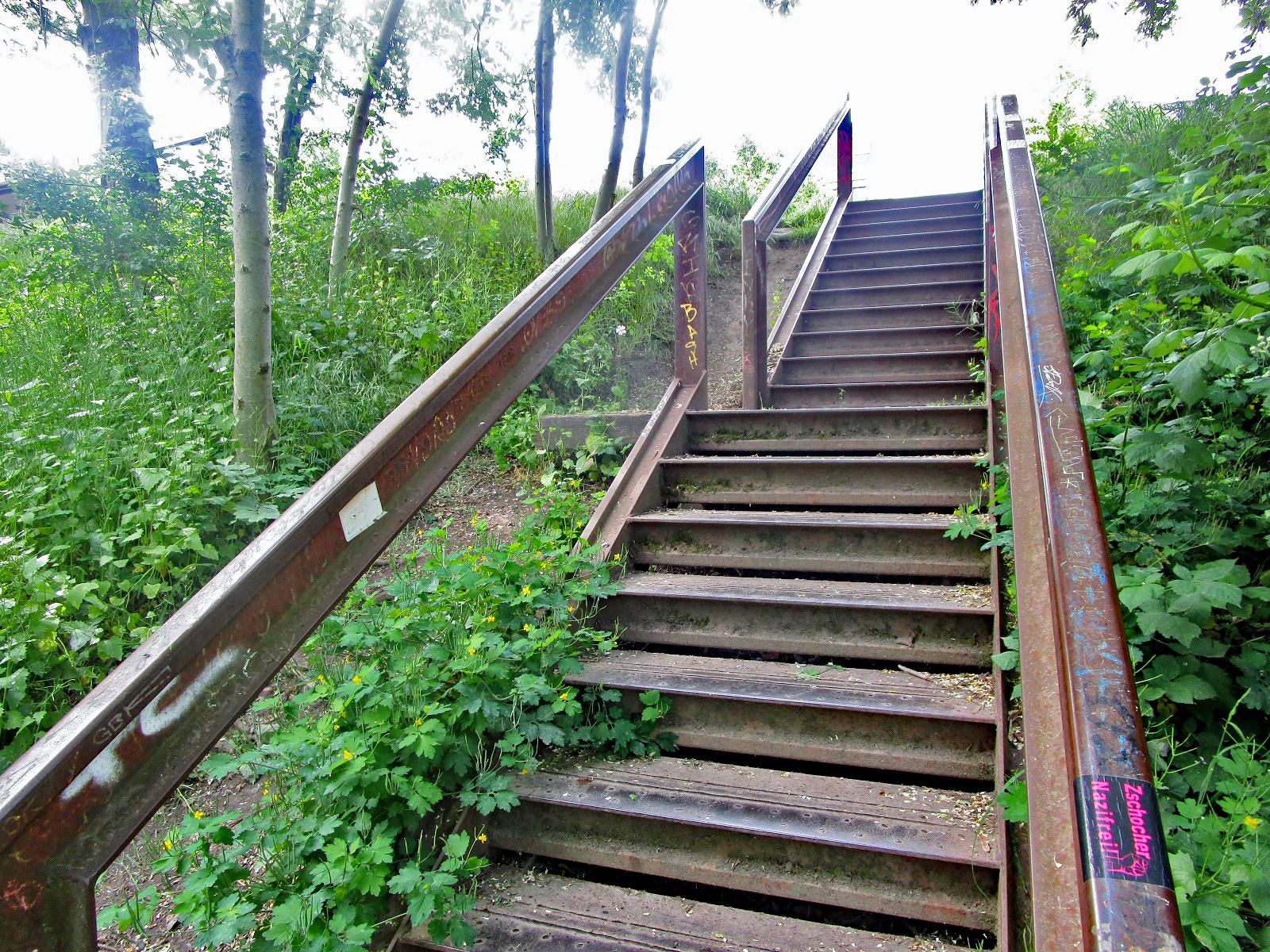
Stairs made from recycled train tracks in the neighbourhood park

The neighbourhood park was built in two phases of construction (1999 to 2002 and 2004 to 2007). Based on a competition and design by the Lützow 7 landscape planning firm in Berlin, a park in which railway remains are still preserved was created on a 2.7 ha (7 acres) former railway area between Industriestrasse and the Karl-Heine Canal. In the 2010s, this park was networked with the GleisGrünZug on the site of the former industrial goods station to the west of the locality. The areas have been developed there since 2012 with the active participation of the civil society initiative "Bürgerbahnhof Plagwitz" (litt.: Plagwitz community station), with an adventure construction playground, a scout zone, community gardens, an orchard as well as a café with bike and playground rental. The Plagwitz community station has been named winner of the Bundespreis Stadtgrün 2020 (Federal Urban Green Award 2020).

== Traffic ==
Regional trains on the Leipzig – Gera – Saalfeld line and the S1 line of the Central Germany S-Bahn stop at Leipzig-Plagwitz station.

Tram line 3 runs through Plagwitz in a north-south direction (on Zschochersche Strasse), line 14 runs in a west-east direction along the northern boundary of the locality (Karl-Heine-Strasse). Both connect Plagwitz to the city center. The two streets mentioned are also the main arteries of private motorized transportation. In addition, bus line 60 connects the west of Plagwitz with Neulindenau in one direction and Kleinzschocher, the south of Schleußig and Südvorstadt in the other. Bus route 74 provides connections between the east of Plagwitz and Altlindenau as well as Schleußig and Südvorstadt.

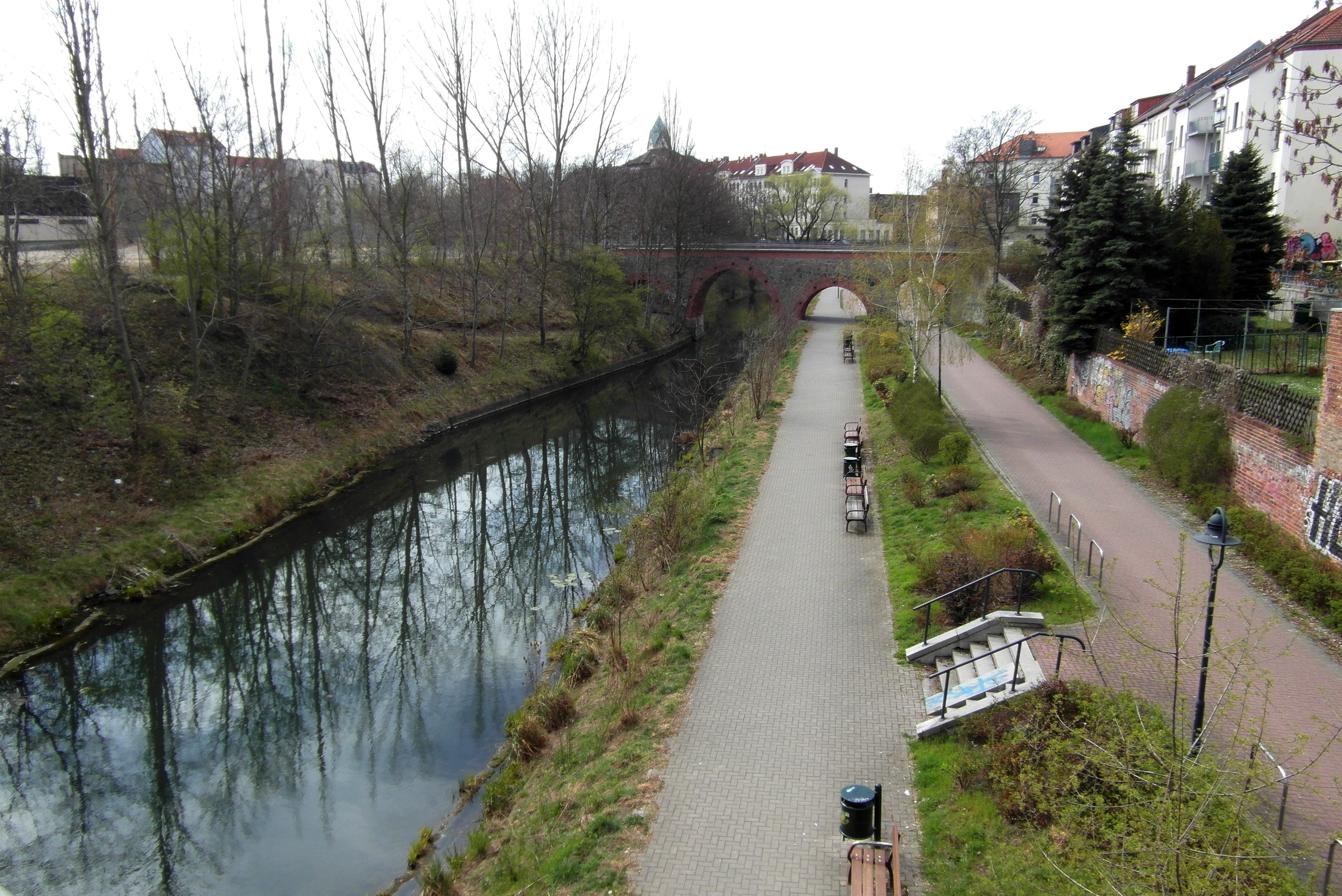
Walking and cycling path along the Karl Heine Canal, via the PI track bridge (in the background), a walking and cycling path leads from Plagwitz station to Henriettenpark.

As part of the urban renewal measures, a whole series of new walking and cycling paths have been created in Plagwitz. It all started with the path along the Karl Heine Canal, which was inaugurated in 1996 after three years of preparation and construction by its godmother, then Federal Minister of the Environment, Angela Merkel. This measure received €3,840,000 in funding from the Land of Saxony, the Federal Government of Germany and the European Commission. Other tracks were created on the old railway sidings, which extend from Plagwitz station to the district like the strings of a harp. Some of these trails lead to newly created parks such as the Plagwitz neighbourhood park on Industriestrasse or the Henriettenpark, which is already located in the Lindenau locality.

== Notable people associated with Plagwitz ==
- Karl Heine (1819-1888), entrepreneur, developed the locality
- Marie Huch (1853–1934), writer, born in Plagwitz
- Max Klinger (1857-1920), sculptor, lived in Plagwitz
- Walter Cramer (1886–1944), textile entrepreneur, member of the failed 20 July Plot to assassinate Adolf Hitler
- Erich Zeigner (1886-1949), lawyer and politician (Socialist Unity Party of Germany, Social Democratic Party of Germany), mayor of Leipzig (1945-1949), lived in Plagwitz
