= Karl Heine =

German lawyer and entrepreneur

Ernst Karl (sometimes also Carl) Erdmann Heine (January 10, 1819 – August 25, 1888) was a lawyer in Leipzig and a major entrepreneur and industrial pioneer who shaped the face of the western suburbs of Leipzig.

== Life ==
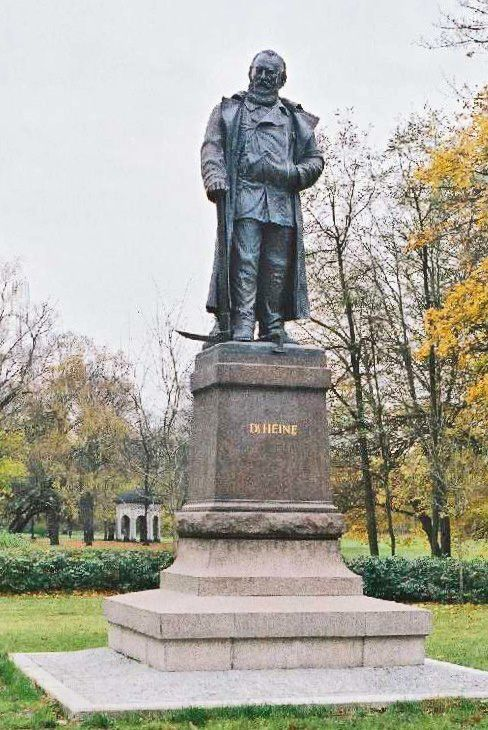
Karl Heine's monument in Leipzig

Karl Heine was born in Leipzig, to the owner of Neuscherbitz Estate, Johann Carl Friedrich Heine, and his wife Christiana Dorothea, née Reichel (1781–1857). He attended the Thomasschule zu Leipzig, a public boarding school in Leipzig. Later he studied law at the University of Leipzig - he was member of the Corps Saxonia Leipzig fraternity. He received a doctorate on the economic use of waterways and shores according to Saxon state law. Later, he established himself as a barrister in Leipzig.

After the death of his grandfather E.T. Reichel (1748–1832), Karl Heine bought the shares of Reichel's Garden from another heir, took these pieces of land and from the medial of the 19th century on, he gradually built what is today the inner western suburb of Leipzig.

In 1854, Heine also expanded his estate in the Gemeinde Plagwitz district of Leipzig; in 1856, he began the construction of the first section of a navigable canal connecting the rivers White Elster and Saale, which today bears his name (Karl Heine Canal). The excavation of the canal reclaimed which was later to become the western suburb of Leipzig. To institute his plans for construction and industrialization, Heine established an "economy" in Plagwitz.

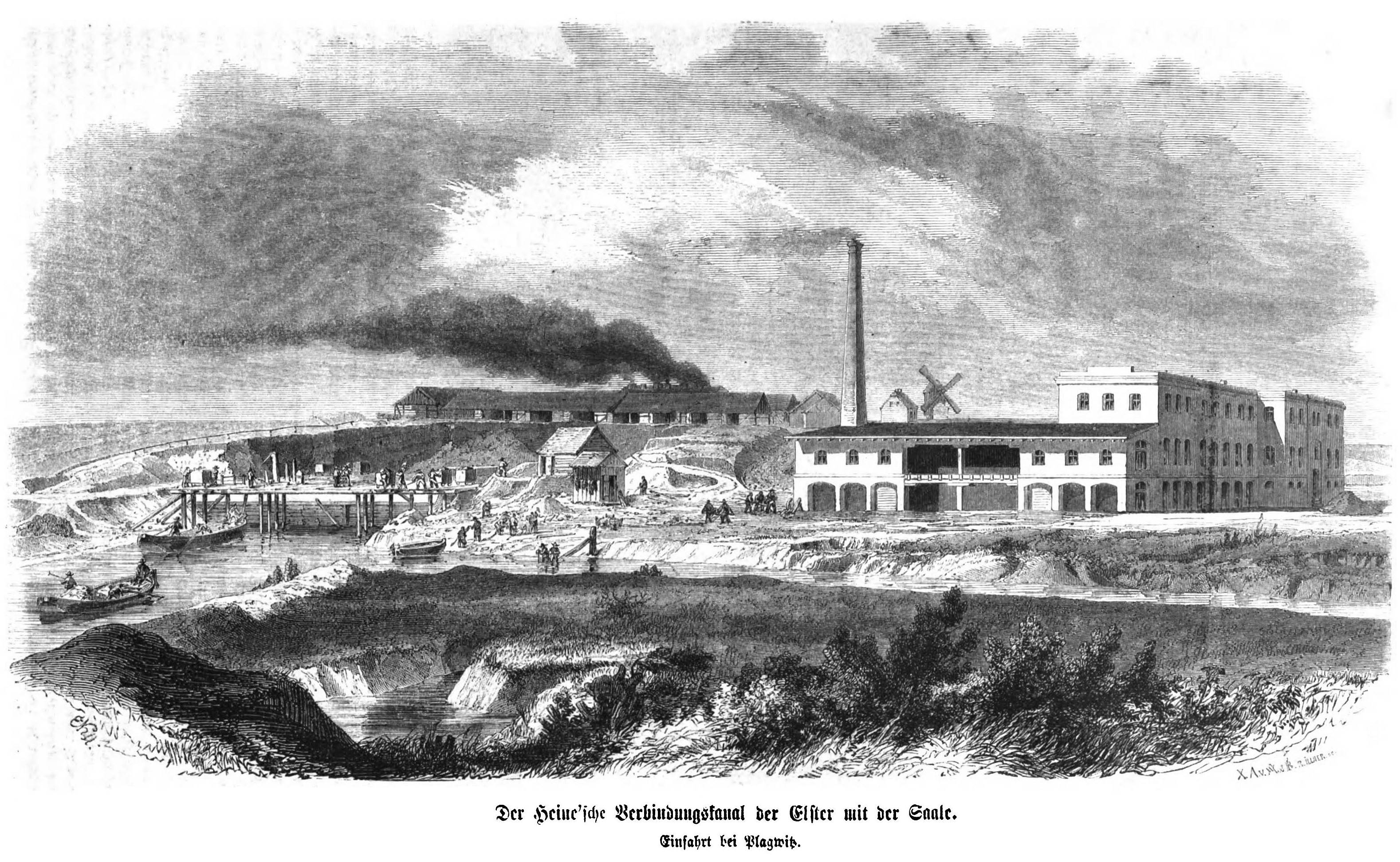
The Heine Canal connecting the Elster with the Saale. Entrance near Plagwitz. In the Die Gartenlaube, 1856

When the western suburb was connected to Gemeinde Plagwitz, Heine constructed the Plagwitzer Straße (today named Käthe-Kollwitz-Straße), a street to the south of the old highway from Leipzig to Lindenau, which ran parallel to the new street. Against the opposition of the Leipzig council, he also built the Plagwitz bridge, which connected to the Leipziger Straße in Plagwitz (today: Karl-Heine-Straße).

Karl Heine was a member of the Saxon Diet from 1870 to his death. He was also a representative in the Leipzig city council.

In 1874, he moved into his newly built villa in Neuschleußig (Karl-Heine-Villa, Könneritzstraße 1), where he resided until his death.

In 1876, a construction scheme was approved which encompassed merging Karl Heine's meadows and fields in the northern part of Schleußig (Neuschleußig) with Bernhard Hüffer's (1824–1904) estate and extensive undeveloped forest land. These areas would be designated as new residential areas.

On May 24, 1888, Heine founded the Westend-Baugesellschaft, a construction company, to continue his work in developing the Leipzig economy after his death.

Since 1854, Karl Heine had also been a member of the Leipzig masonic lodge Apollo. He died on August 25, 1888, aged 69, in Leipzig.

== Honours ==
In 1897, the city of Leipzig honoured Karl Heine with a monument. The monument was melted down in the Second World War but was renewed in 2001. Many streets and one plaza are named after him. (Erdmannstraße, 1891; Karl-Heine-Strasse, 1904; Karl-Heine-Platz, et al.)

In 2003, a Leipzig vocational school adopted the name of Karl-Heine-Schule.
