= Boroughs and localities of Leipzig =

The boroughs and localities of Leipzig.

Leipzig is divided into ten boroughs or districts (Stadtbezirke). The boroughs are further divided into localities (Ortsteile). The administrative division of Leipzig has been formed over the centuries since the town charter from 1156/70. From 1889 onwards, many neighbouring municipalities were incorporated into the city of Leipzig to form a city of localities (Stadtteil). From 1889 to 1925, the district of Leipzig lost 32 municipalities by incorporation into the city of Leipzig. There are about a hundred of localities, depending on how you count them. As the city gradually incorporated new localities, its area increased.

After German reunification, the Leipzig authorities carried out a territorial reform in 1992, dividing the city into ten boroughs (Stadtbezirk) comprising 63 localities (Ortsteil). Until that, there were seven boroughs. These new localities do not always correspond to the previous localities. In order to achieve administrative and demographic standardization, some localities were divided into several localities, others were grouped into a single locality.

== Boroughs and localities ==
Borough	Locality	Map
0 Leipzig-Mitte	00 Zentrum	
0 Leipzig-Mitte	01 Zentrum-Ost	
0 Leipzig-Mitte	02 Zentrum-Südost	
0 Leipzig-Mitte	03 Zentrum-Süd	
0 Leipzig-Mitte	04 Zentrum-West	
0 Leipzig-Mitte	05 Zentrum-Nordwest	
0 Leipzig-Mitte	06 Zentrum-Nord	
1 Leipzig-Nordost	10 Schönefeld-Abtnaundorf	
1 Leipzig-Nordost	11 Schönefeld-Ost	
1 Leipzig-Nordost	12 Mockau-Süd	
1 Leipzig-Nordost	13 Mockau-Nord	
1 Leipzig-Nordost	14 Thekla	
1 Leipzig-Nordost	15 Plaußig-Portitz	
2 Leipzig-Ost	20 Neustadt-Neuschönefeld	
2 Leipzig-Ost	21 Volkmarsdorf	
2 Leipzig-Ost	22 Anger-Crottendorf	
2 Leipzig-Ost	23 Sellerhausen-Stünz	
2 Leipzig-Ost	24 Paunsdorf	
2 Leipzig-Ost	25 Heiterblick	
2 Leipzig-Ost	26 Mölkau	
2 Leipzig-Ost	27 Engelsdorf	
2 Leipzig-Ost	28 Baalsdorf	
2 Leipzig-Ost	29 Althen-Kleinpösna	
3 Leipzig-Südost	30 Reudnitz-Thonberg	
3 Leipzig-Südost	31 Stötteritz	
3 Leipzig-Südost	32 Probstheida	
3 Leipzig-Südost	33 Meusdorf	
3 Leipzig-Südost	34 Liebertwolkwitz	
3 Leipzig-Südost	35 Holzhausen	
4 Leipzig-Süd	40 Südvorstadt	
4 Leipzig-Süd	41 Connewitz	
4 Leipzig-Süd	42 Marienbrunn	
4 Leipzig-Süd	43 Lößnig	
4 Leipzig-Süd	44 Dölitz-Dösen	
5 Leipzig-Südwest	50 Schleußig	
5 Leipzig-Südwest	51 Plagwitz	
5 Leipzig-Südwest	52 Kleinzschocher	
5 Leipzig-Südwest	53 Großzschocher	
5 Leipzig-Südwest	54 Knautkleeberg-Knauthain	
5 Leipzig-Südwest	55 Hartmannsdorf-Knautnaundorf	
6 Leipzig-West	60 Schönau	
6 Leipzig-West	61 Grünau-Ost	
6 Leipzig-West	62 Grünau-Mitte	
6 Leipzig-West	63 Grünau-Siedlung	
6 Leipzig-West	64 Lausen-Grünau	
6 Leipzig-West	65 Grünau-Nord	
6 Leipzig-West	66 Miltitz	
7 Leipzig-Alt-West	70 Lindenau	
7 Leipzig-Alt-West	71 Altlindenau	
7 Leipzig-Alt-West	72 Neulindenau	
7 Leipzig-Alt-West	73 Leutzsch	
7 Leipzig-Alt-West	74 Böhlitz-Ehrenberg	
7 Leipzig-Alt-West	75 Burghausen-Rückmarsdorf	
8 Leipzig-Nordwest	80 Möckern	
8 Leipzig-Nordwest	81 Wahren	
8 Leipzig-Nordwest	82 Lützschena-Stahmeln	
8 Leipzig-Nordwest	83 Lindenthal	
9 Leipzig-Nord	90 Gohlis-Süd	
9 Leipzig-Nord	91 Gohlis-Mitte	
9 Leipzig-Nord	92 Gohlis-Nord	
9 Leipzig-Nord	93 Eutritzsch	
9 Leipzig-Nord	94 Seehausen	
9 Leipzig-Nord	95 Wiederitzsch	
