= Lindenau (Leipzig) =

District of Leipzig in Saxony, Germany

- Stadtteil of Leipzig
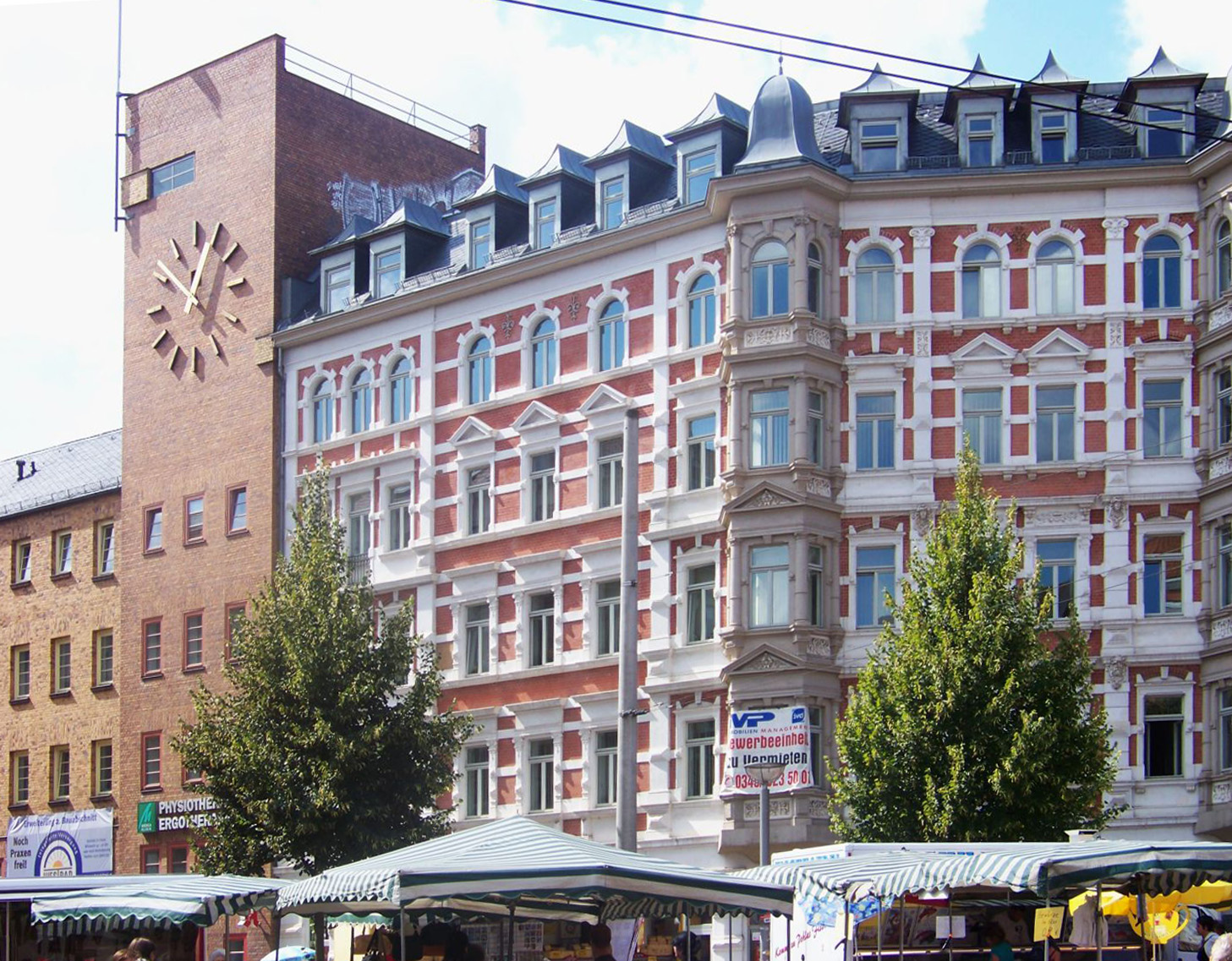
- Lindenauer Markt, Westbad building

- Coat of arms

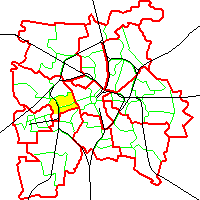
- Location of Lindenau within Leipzig
- Interactive map of Lindenau
- Location within Germany Location within Saxony
- Coordinates: 51°20′14″N 12°20′04″E
- Country: Germany
- State: Saxony
- City: Leipzig

Area
  - Total: 5.9 km^{2} (2.3 sq mi)
- Elevation: 115 m (377 ft)

Population (2022)
  - Total: 35,025
  - Density: 5,900/km^{2} (15,000/sq mi)
- Time zone: UTC+01:00 (CET)
  - Summer (DST): UTC+02:00 (CEST)
- Postal codes: 04177
- Dialling codes: 0341

Lindenau (German pronunciation: [ˈlɪndənaʊ]) is a locality of Leipzig, in Saxony, Germany. It is part of the Stadtbezirk (borough) Alt-West.

== Geography ==
The locality is located about 3 km (2 mi) west of Leipzig city centre. It borders Plagwitz to the south and Leutzsch to the northwest - the built-up area merges into these neighbouring quarters without any noticeable separation. Administratively, Karl-Heine-Strasse was set as the border with Plagwitz and Priessnitzstrasse as the border with Leutzsch. The eastern border is formed by the Elster basin and the Palmengarten, a park created at the end of the 19th century. Parts of the riverside forest border to the north. To the west, the Lindenau harbour site separates Lindenau from Schönau. Most of the Karl Heine Canal runs through the locality. The old centre of Lindenau is the area around the Lindenauer Markt (formerly the village square with a pond), in the immediate vicinity of which is the Protestant Nathanael Church.

Two bridges connect Lindenau with Leipzig-Mitte: the Zeppelin Bridge and the Klinger Bridge.

== Population ==
| Year | Inhabitants |
|---|---|
| 1834 | 998 |
| 1871 | 7.484 |
| 1890 | 25.591 |

| Year | Inhabitants |
|---|---|
| 2000 | 21.030 |
| 2005 | 22.712 |
| 2010 | 24.187 |
| 2015 | 30.692 |
| 2020 | 34.235 |
| 2023 | 35.882 |

== History ==
=== Village ===
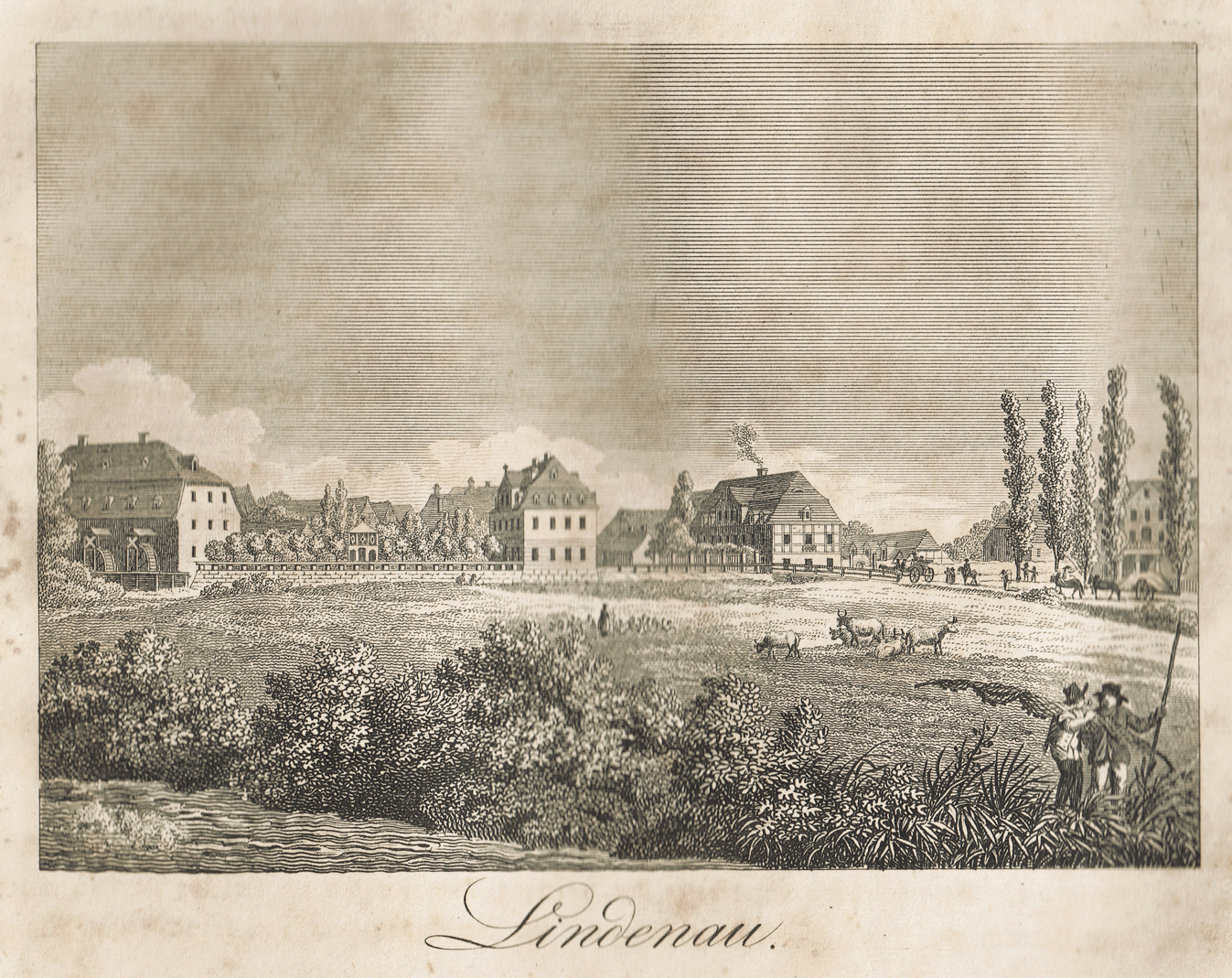
View of Lindenau after the Battle of Leipzig (1815)

Around the year 1000, German immigrants founded the village on the west bank of the White Elster. In 1021, Emperor Henry II donated the place on the Via Regia to the Diocese of Merseburg. Even after the Reformation, until 1815, the village belonged to the area of the Episcopal Principality of Merseburg under electoral Saxon sovereignty (Amt Lützen). By resolutions of the Congress of Vienna, the western part of Amt Lützen was ceded to Prussia in 1815. However, the exclave of Lindenau and the eastern part of Amt Lützen remained under the supervision of the Kingdom of Saxony and were integrated into the Kreisamt of Leipzig.

Lindenau has been documented as a knight's seat since 1182, when a knight Dietrich von Lindenau (Didericus de Lindinouve) was named in a document. The brothers Sigismund and Caspar von Lindenau sold the knight's seat and the village to the Leipzig council in 1527 and the von Lindenau family moved their headquarters to Machern. Even before the Protestant Reformation, Lindenau had a parish church, but in 1562 the community became a branch of the Leutzsch parish priest. This remained so for over 300 years. Until the middle of the 19th century, Lindenau was an agricultural village. In addition to agriculture and livestock breeding, fishing along the rivers and in the artificial ponds was an important source of income for the inhabitants.

During the Thirty Years' War, Lindenau was plundered and destroyed in 1631, 1637 and 1642. During the Battle of Leipzig, fighting also took place in front of Lindenau. During his withdrawal, Emperor Napoleon stayed briefly at the Lindenauer Mühle (Lindenau Mill) on 19 October 1813.

=== Rural community ===
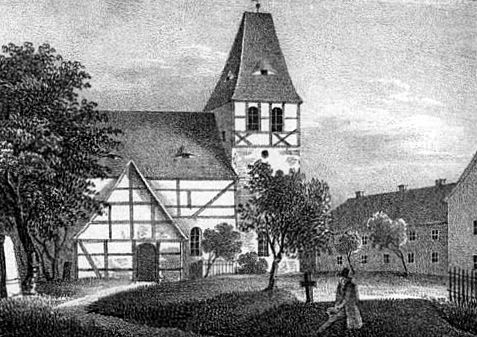
Former village church of Lindenau (around 1850)

Thanks to the new Saxon Rural Community Regulation (Sächsische Landgemeindeordnung of 1838), Lindenau became an independent community in 1839. In 1859, the place was equipped with a post office and in 1863 with a gasworks. In the second half of the 19th century, the entrepreneur Karl Heine acquired extensive properties in and around Lindenau and had building land developed there. As in the neighbouring town of Plagwitz, the streets were laid out for future residential and industrial development. Heine also began construction of the canal that today bears his name and negotiated paving contracts with the governments of Prussia and Saxony so that the planned industrial area could be connected to the railways of both countries. With the introduction of freedom of trade in 1860, the foundations for the rapid industrial development of Lindenau were laid.

In 1871, an iron foundry was the first major company to settle there. A year later, the horse-drawn tram line to Plagwitz was opened and electrified from 1896. In 1873, the Plagwitz railway station, also important for Lindenau, was put into operation. Karl Heine had industrial connections and three loading points built from the station for 37 factories, one of which is the former loading point III on the site of today's "Henriettenpark". In 1884, the new Protestant Nathanael Church was inaugurated near Lindenauer Markt. A few years earlier, the parish of Lindenau had become independent again.

=== Quarter of Leipzig ===
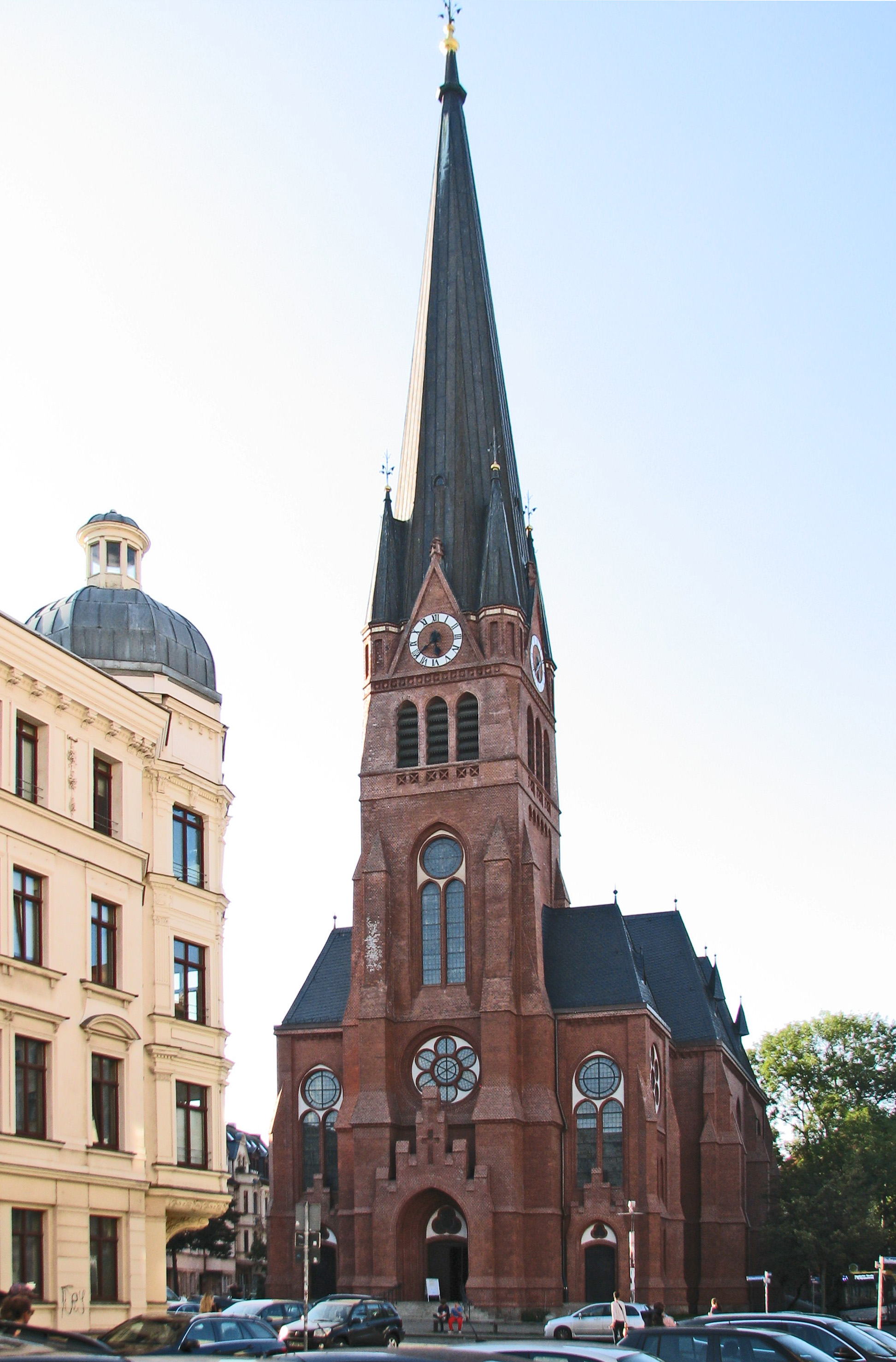
Nathanael Protestant Church (2021)

In 1891, Lindenau was incorporated into Leipzig. There were now 66 companies employing over 3,000 people in the quarter. Over the next two decades, Lindenau underwent extensive construction, many new streets with apartment buildings and factories were added, and the population continued to grow. Between 1893 and 1898, the Lindenauer Ratswiesen of the Kuhturm east of the Kuhburger Wasser were transformed into a landscaped garden, the Palmengarten. The large palm grove, a steel and glass structure, gave it its name.

The Philippus Church was built between 1907 and 1910, so that Lindenau now had two Protestant communities. The Catholic Church of Our Lady was inaugurated in 1908. In 1912, a brewery had the ballroom built, which today serves as a musical theatre (Musikalische Komödie). In 1925, the tram depot was built at Angerbrücke. In 1927, Lindenau was the most populated quarter of Leipzig with 63,500 inhabitants.

Construction of the Lindenauer Hafen canal port began in 1938. The aim was to connect Leipzig to the German waterways via the Elster-Saale Canal, which was also not yet completed. However, the construction work carried out by the National Socialists with the aim of creating jobs was interrupted during the war and was not resumed afterwards. The National Socialists had the Palmengarten and the old Kuhturm demolished in 1939 because they wanted to use the Palmengarten area for the Reich Gutenberg Exhibition. This no longer happened because of the war. From the destruction of the New Theater Leipzig in 1944 until the opening of the Leipzig Opera in 1960, opera was performed at the Dreilinden Haus in Lindenau. On 18 April 1945, the last shot of an American soldier of World War II to die in front of his lens was photographed by Robert Capa at the corner of Jahnallee 61 and Lützener Strasse (Capa House). The identity of the deceased soldier Raymond J. Bowman was not discovered until 67 years after the end of the war by German military historian Jürgen Möller.

Endersstrasse, same perspective

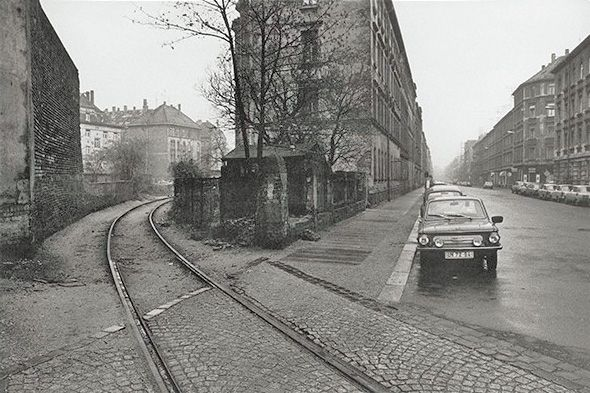
Status 1989

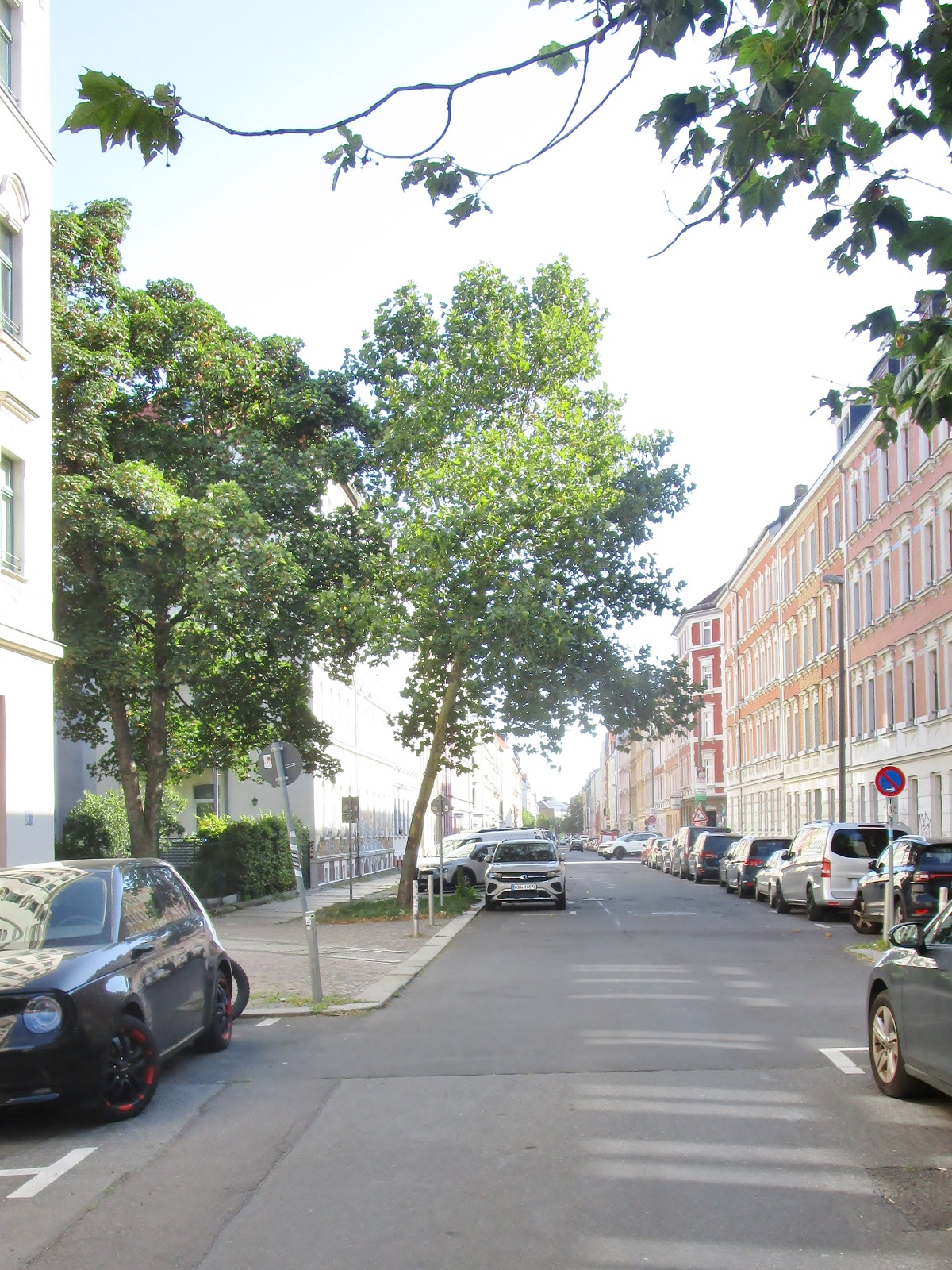
Status 2024

After the Second World War, the development of Lindenau stagnated for decades. There was hardly any new construction and the appearance of the district only changed due to the gradual decay and demolition of some buildings. The population steadily declined. This trend continued after 1989. Many residents were already leaving before 1989. With this change, industrial production collapsed.

At the beginning of the 21st century, Lindenau consists mainly of a large, largely preserved Gründerzeit historicist-style district that was renovated during the redevelopment of the East of Germany. As part of the urban renewal area Leipzig West, Lindenau is a popular residential area with numerous cultural institutions and a rapidly growing population.

== Buildings ==
- Leipziger Baumwollspinnerei between Spinnereistrasse and Alter Salzstrasse. Several important galleries have now settled on the site of the Leipziger Baumwollspinnerei. Lindenau can therefore be considered the centre of the so-called New Leipzig School.
- Westbad, a testimony to Bauhaus architecture, built between 1928 and 1930, architect: director of urban planning Hubert Ritter. Today it is used as a medical center and a sports club.
- Former Max Klinger School, Karl-Heine-Strasse 22 b (1927-1929), also designed by Hubert Ritter. Today: Schule am Palmengarten.
- Leipzig Deaconess Hospital (Diakonissenhaus), a traditional Protestant hospital, on Georg-Schwarz-Strasse.
- The five-storey wooden house Z8 (Holzhaus Z8), built in 2017, was awarded the Saxon State Prize for Building Culture (Sächsischer Staatspreis für Baukultur) and the Leipzig Architecture Prize (Architekturpreis der Stadt Leipzig).
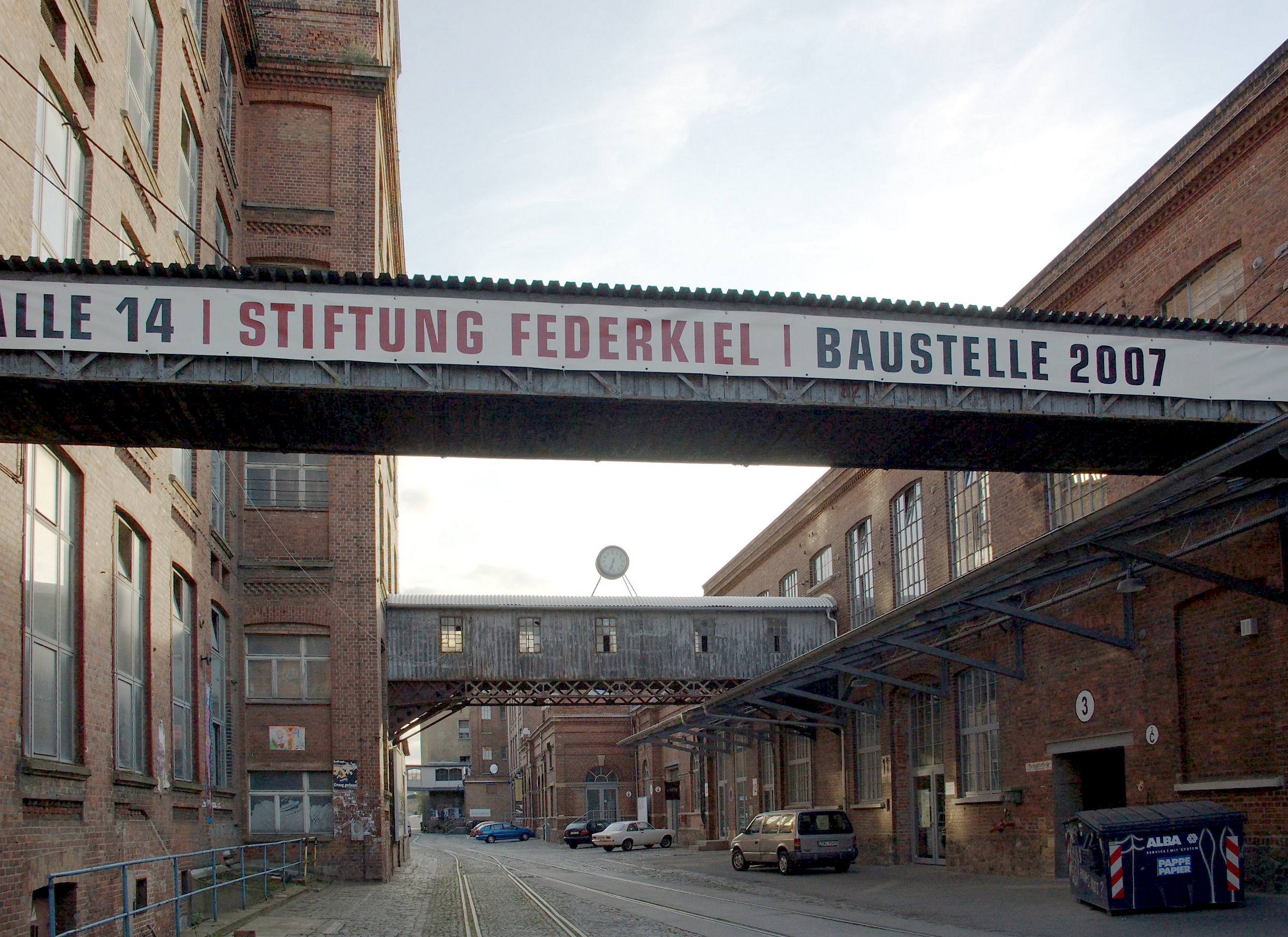
Site of the Leipziger Baumwollspinnerei

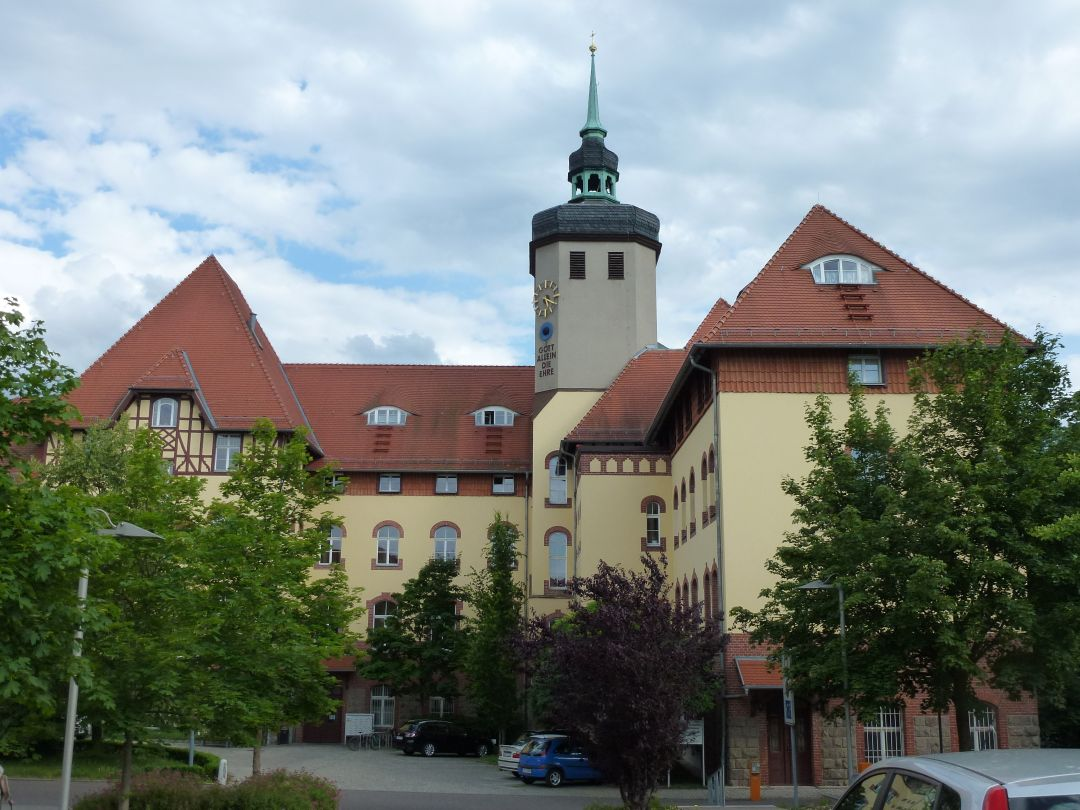
Leipzig Deaconess Hospital (Diakonissenhaus)

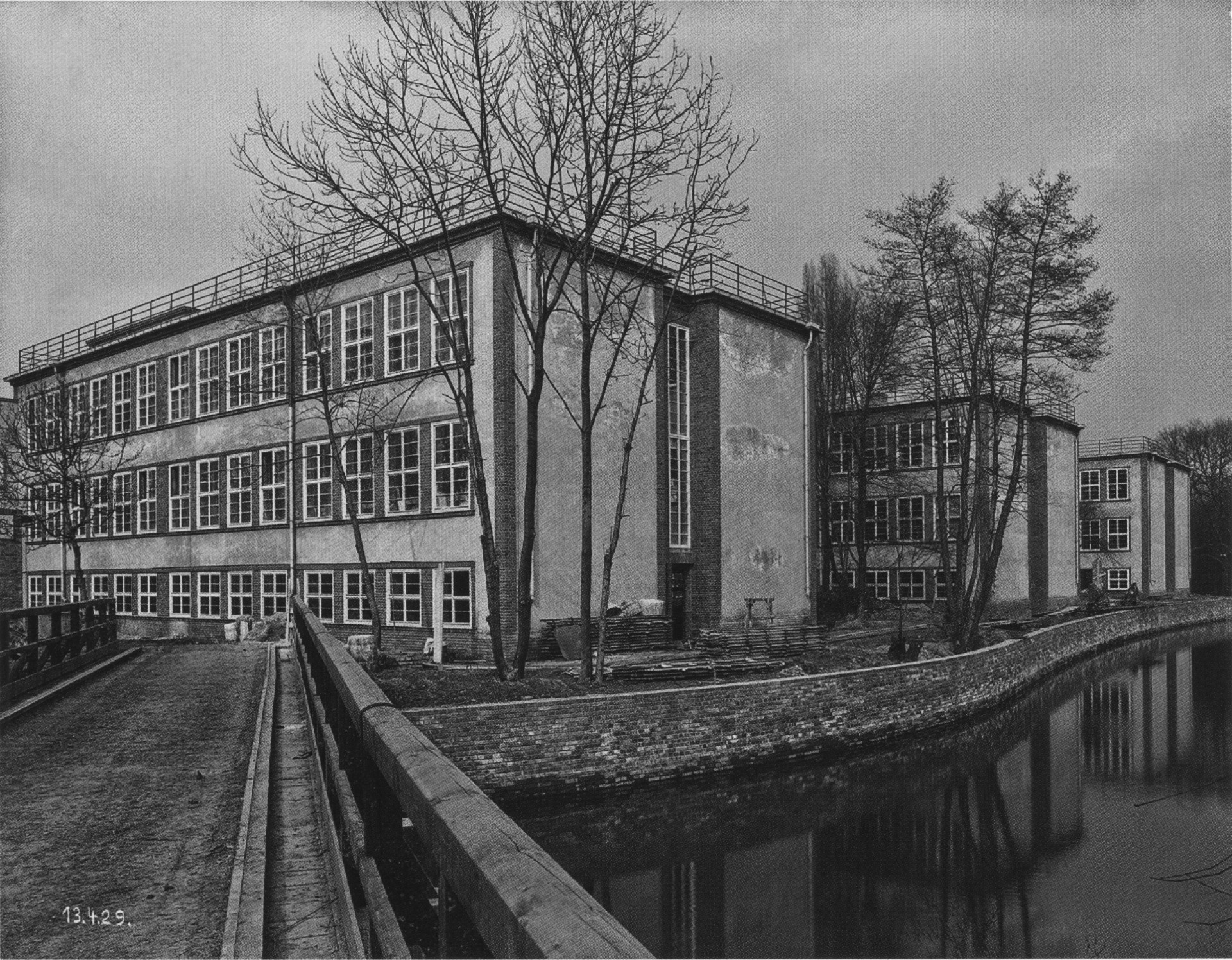
Former Max Klinger School on Karl-Heine-Strasse

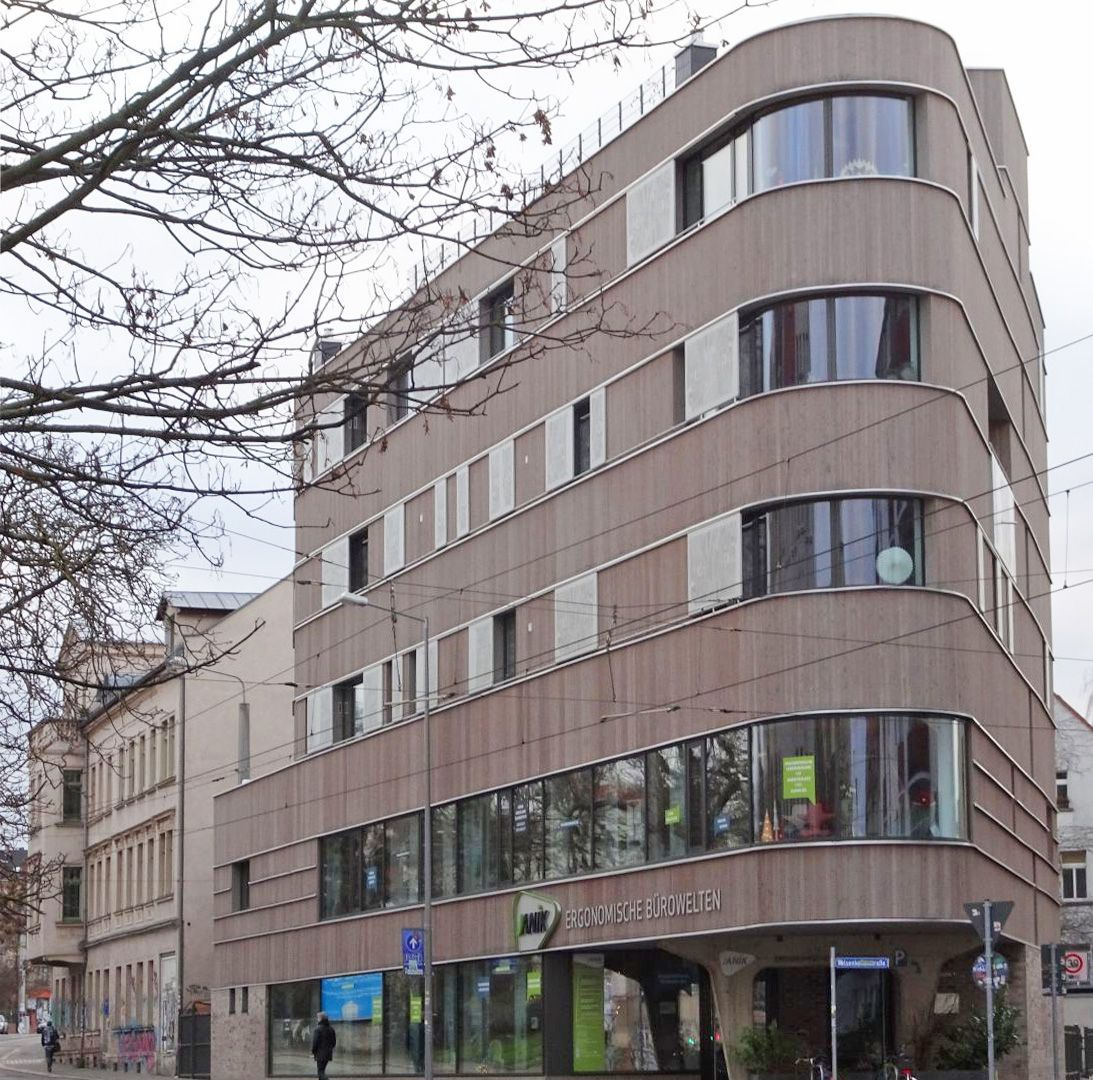
Wooden house on Zschochersche Strasse

== Cultural infrastructure ==
Lindenau has eight theatres: the Musikalische Komödie at Haus Dreilinden, the Schaubühne Lindenfels, the Lindenfels Westflügel, the Theaterhaus am Lindenauer Markt as the venue for the Theater der Junge Welt, the Leipzig Off-Theater LOFFT on the grounds of the Leipziger Baumwollspinnerei and the Neues Schauspiel Leipzig at Lützner Straße 29. The cabaret Leipziger Brettl - founded in 1979 as the Lindenauer Brettl cabaret - then at the Haus der Volkskunst (today's Theater der Junge Welt) has been playing again since 2007 with a small Brettl stage on Odermannstraße near the Lindenauer Markt (Gambrinus entrance). Between 2008 and 2018, there was also the revue theatre "Am Palmengarten" with a hall for up to 150 people; it was created by converting the listed petrol station building from 1944.

There are two commercial art centres in Lindenau: the Leipziger Baumwollspinnerei and the Tapetenwerk. An Artist-run space space is located in the Kunstkraftwerk. Some smaller cultural spaces have been created in the so-called Wächterhäuser, for example the art associations D21 Kunstraum Leipzig 20 and Kuhturm e. V.

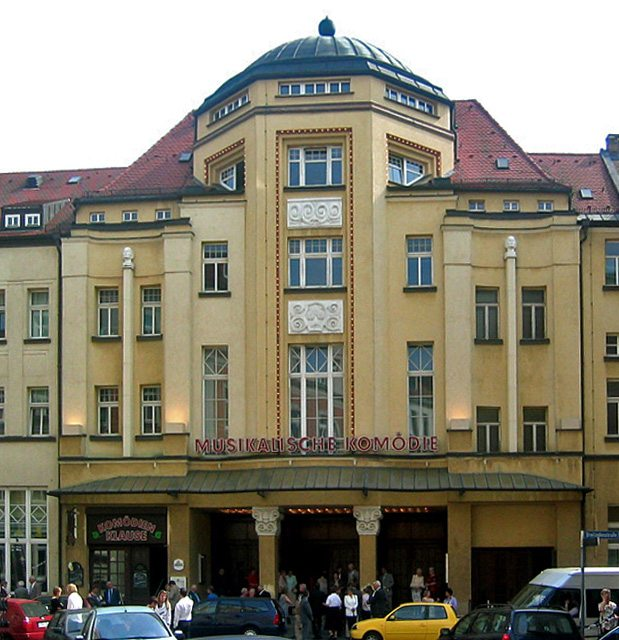
Musikalische Komödie (2004)

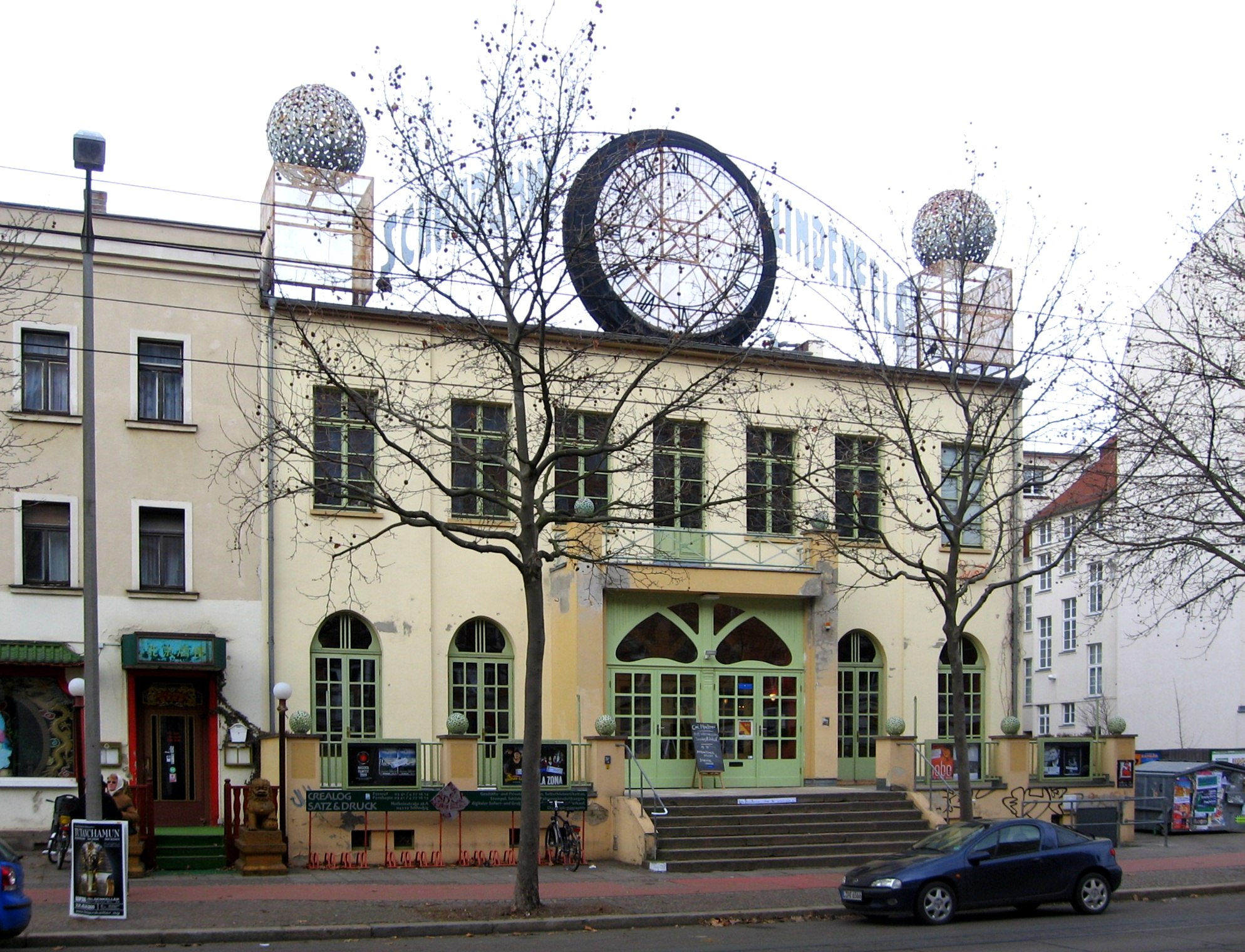
Schaubühne Lindenfels (2009)

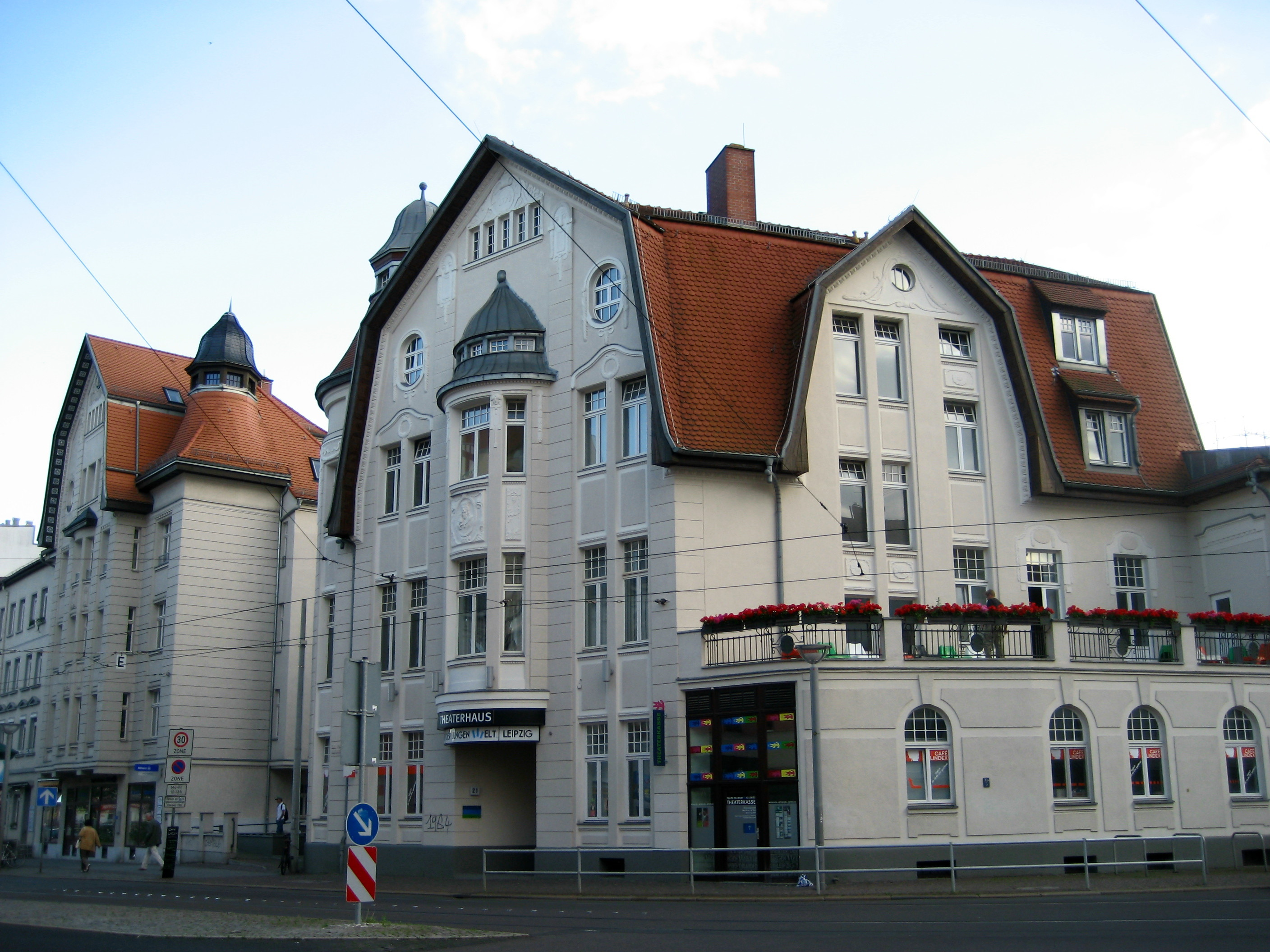
Theaterhaus am Lindenauer Markt (2007)

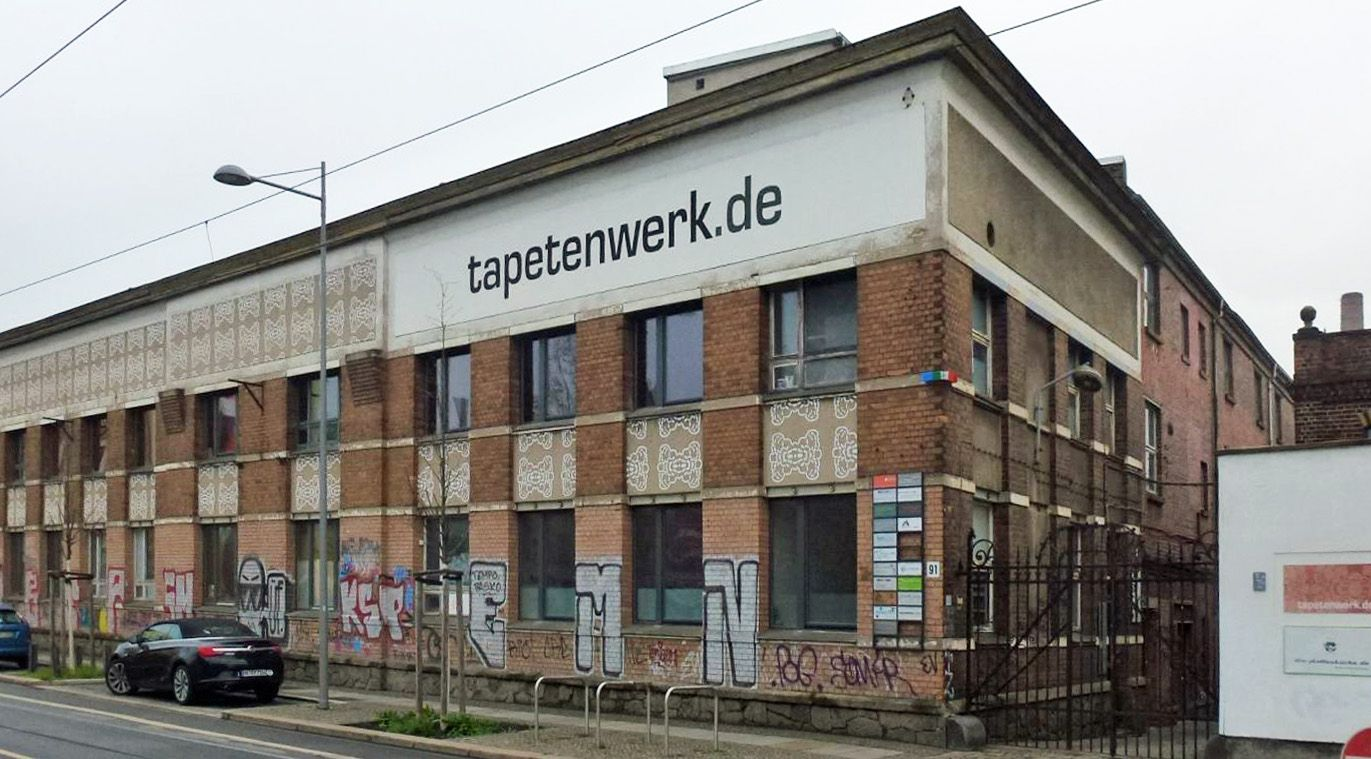
Tapetenwerk (2014)

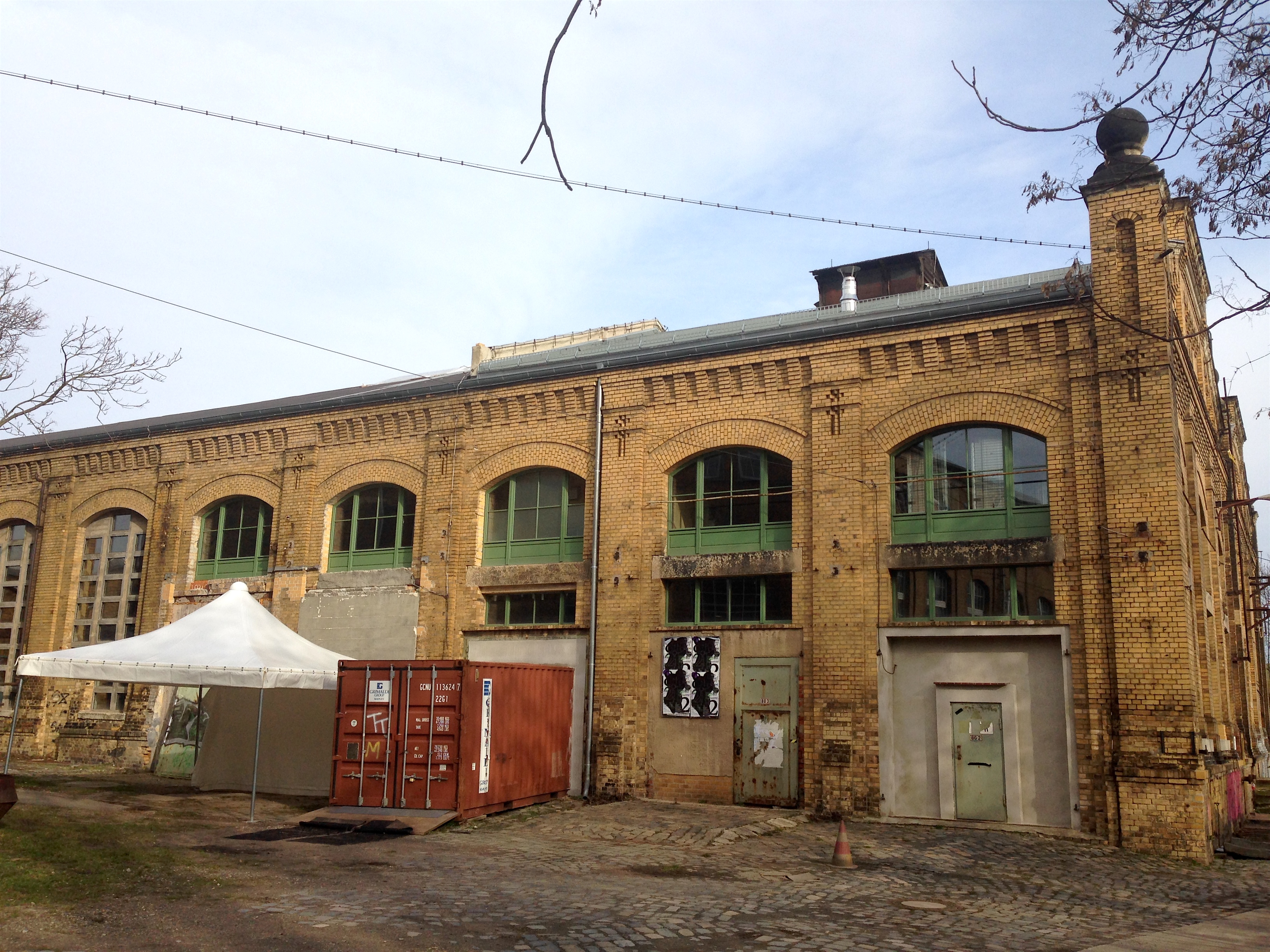
Kunstkraftwerk (2016)

== Traffic ==
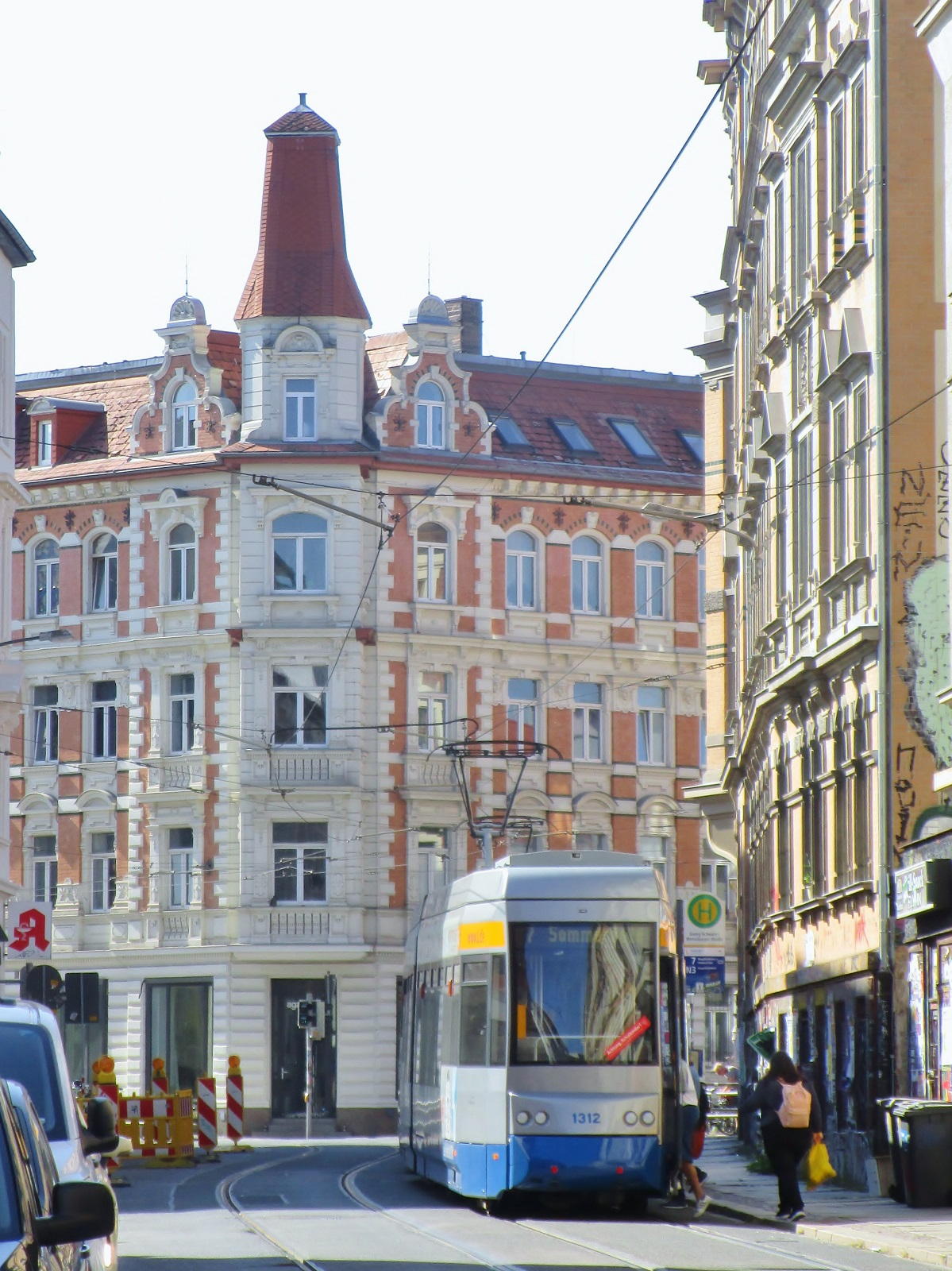
The Georg-Schwarz-/Merseburger Straße tram stop in Lindenau

Tram lines 7, 8 and 15 pass through Lindenauer Markt. At the Angerbrücke tram station, line 3 also reaches the Lindenau quarter and line 14 runs on the southern edge in Karl-Heine-Strasse. The latter connects Lindenau and the western districts to the city centre via the Klinger Bridge (Klingerbrücke), the other four lines via the Zeppelin Bridge (Zeppelinbrücke). Bus line 74 has its intersection point at Lindenauer Markt, bus line 60 at Lindenauer Hafen, from where both routes lead via the Südvorstadt to the east of Leipzig.

To the west of the quarter is the Lindenau S-Bahn station on the S1 or S10 line of the Central German S-Bahn running from Stötteritz via the Leipzig Hauptbahnhof to Grünau. Despite its name, Leipzig-Plagwitz station is located in the Neulindenau district.

Lützner Strasse (named after the town of Lützen) and Merseburger Straße form an important east-west connection. Bundesstraße 87 (Leipzig – Weißenfels) crosses it. Part of the Alte Salzstrasse street recalls the former location of the east-west connection before the realignment of 1793. (today Lützner Strasse)

== Sports ==
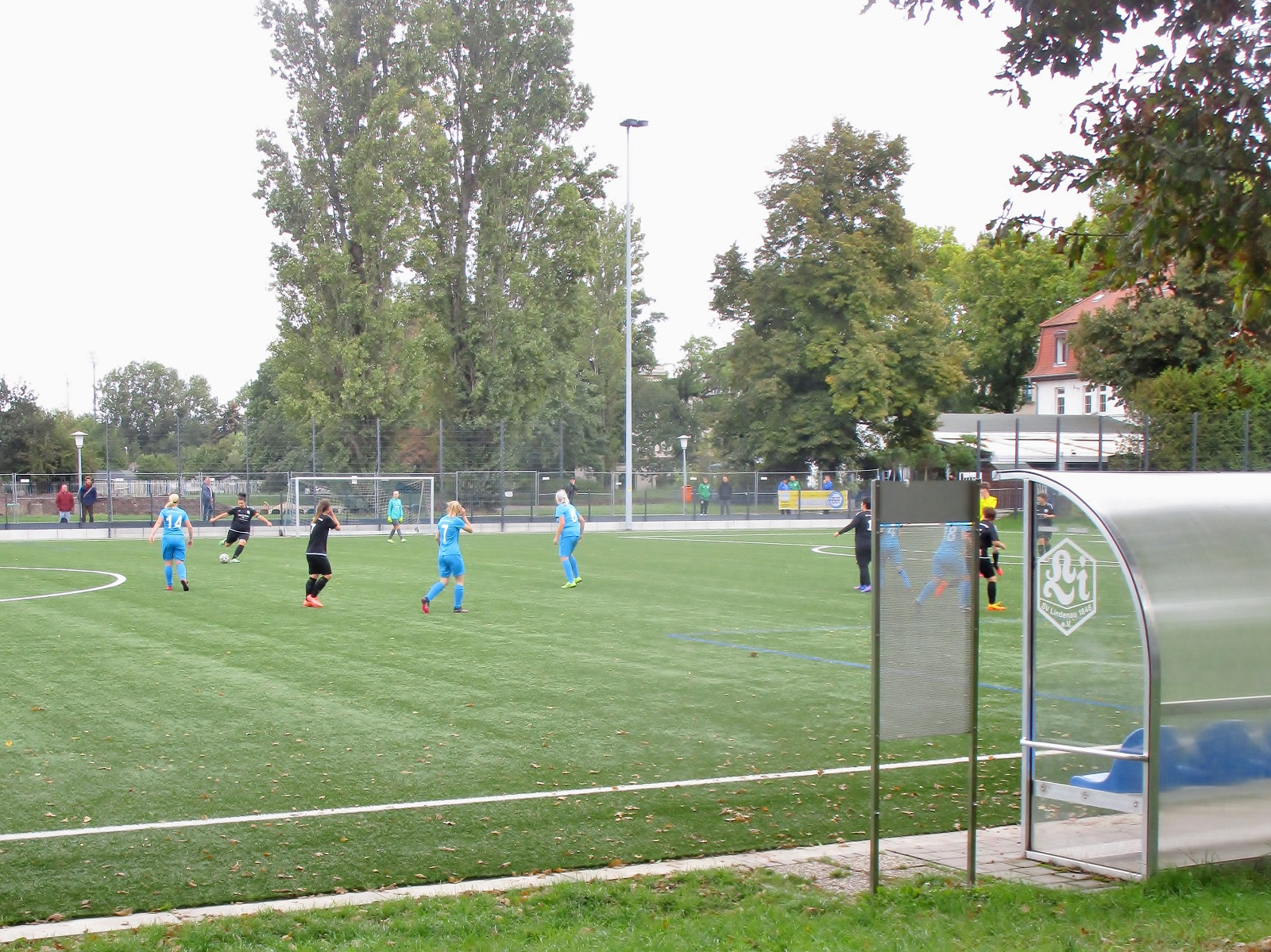
Women's football home match for SV Lindenau 1848

The largest sports facility in Lindenau in terms of area is the training ground of the football club RB Leipzig on the Cottaweg. Other sports grounds include the Charlottenhof sports facilities of the SV Lindenau 1848 and the Karl Enders sports park of the Spielvereinigung 1899 Leipzig. The gymnasiums of the Lindenau school as well as the gymnasiums on GutsMuthsstrasse and Friesenstrasse are also used by various Lindenau sports clubs.

From 1892 there was a velodrome in Lindenau, where the World Track Cycling Championships were held in 1908, 1913 and 1934. The velodrome was demolished in 1938.

== See also ==
- List of streets and squares in Leipzig
