= Zeppelin Bridge =

Zeppelin Bridge Zeppelinbrücke
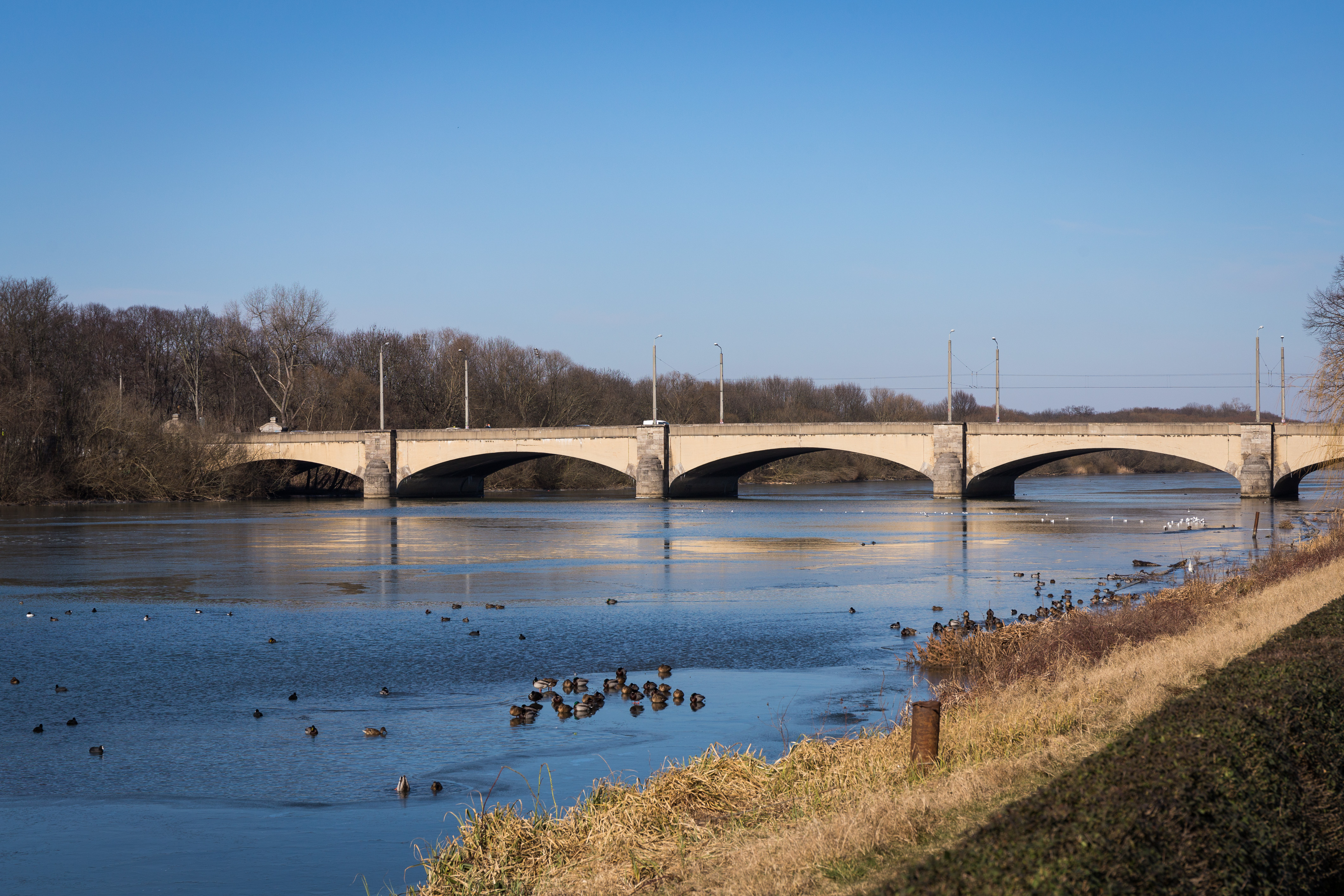
- View from south (2018)
- Coordinates: 51°20′23″N 12°20′50″E
- Carries: 2 tracks of the tram, 2 lanes of Bundesstraße 87, 2 bicycle lanes, 2 walkways for pedestrians
- Locale: Leipzig-Mitte and Altlindenau
- Named for: Ferdinand von Zeppelin
- Owner: City of Leipzig
- Heritage status: Denkmalliste Sachsen
- ID number: II/35

Characteristics
- Design: 5-span arch structure supplemented by another span called Uferwegbrücke
- Material: Stamped and reinforced concrete
- Total length: 155.8 m (511.2 ft)
- Width: 24.8 m (81.4 ft)
- Longest span: 31.3 m (102.7 ft)
- No. of spans: 6
- Piers in water: 4

History
- Architect: Hugo Licht
- Constructed by: Cementbaugeschäft Rudolf Wolle
- Construction start: 1913
- Construction end: 1918
- Opened: 1915
- Rebuilt: 1936

Statistics
- Daily traffic: Motor vehicles, bicycles, trams

The Zeppelin Bridge (German: Zeppelinbrücke) is a road and tram bridge over the Elster basin in Leipzig. It connects the districts of Mitte (locality Zentrum-Nordwest) and Altwest (locality Altlindenau). It is under monument protection.

== Location and importance for traffic ==
The Zeppelin Bridge carries the Jahnallee (Bundesstraße 87) with two lanes in each direction, a double-track tram line and a combined pedestrian and cycle path on both sides over the Elster basin. Since 2020, one lane has been used for cycling in each direction (initially as a pop-up bicycle lane, later marked off), so that one lane for motorized private transport, one cycle lane and one sidewalk are available in each direction.

Leipzig is divided into an eastern and western area by the Leipzig Riverside Forest and the Elsteraue, between which there are only a few transport connections. The Zeppelin Bridge in the course of Jahnallee represents an important east–west connection within the road network of the city of Leipzig, as four important tram lines of the Leipzig Transport Company (LVB) run over the double-track route. The Zeppelin Bridge thus forms one of two existing east–west routes in the Leipzig tram network.

== History ==
A mighty dam was built in front of Lindenau more than a thousand years ago, which led the old trade route Via Regia over the marshy Elster-Luppe-Aue to Leipzig. Around 1740, the Saxon court painter Johann Alexander Thiele (1685–1752) made a painting under the title Look from Lindenau to Leipzig. In the course of flood regulation, the Elster basin was created at the beginning of the 20th century. The Zeppelin Bridge over the Elster flood basin, which was only excavated in the bridge area, was completed in December 1914 so that it could be used by the tram, together with the eastern section of the new Frankfurter Straße (today: Jahnallee). The road was initially connected to the old road at what was then Ziegeleiweg, which ran a little further south and was now interrupted for the further construction of the flood basin. "The generously dimensioned median of the new road section with a special track bed was rightly considered a progressive and promising solution for local public transport at the time."

The bridge was named after Ferdinand von Zeppelin (1838–1917) and the zeppelins he developed. On postcards of that time, the bridge is depicted with a zeppelin. The bridge design was architecturally sophisticated and came from Hugo Licht (1841–1923). The construction was realized by the Cementbaugeschäft Rudolf Wolle, a Leipzig construction company and pioneer of reinforced concrete construction.

After a break in construction due to the war, the bridge was finally completed in 1918 (the Elster basin not until 1925). The bridge was initially flanked at both ends by two bridge houses. With the construction of the neighboring Richard-Wagner-Hain in 1936, the bridge was modified. At that time, the bridge houses on the west side were demolished and an arch over the river side path (the so-called Uferwegbrücke) including the adjacent staircases and transformer rooms were added on the east side. The bridge houses on the east side were destroyed in World War II and not rebuilt.

At around 8:56 p.m. on 20 October 1943, the tram driver Burkert, the conductor Fasold and eleven passengers became some of the first casualties of the air raids on Leipzig during World War II. They were surprised by the air raid alarm in their railcar on the Zeppelin Bridge. The passengers sought shelter on the riverside path while Burkert and Fasold diligently drove their railcar towards town onto roadbed as the bombs fell. On 18 April 1945, the bridge was fought over as the Americans advanced into the city. The U.S. soldier Raymond J. Bowman was killed in action in the immediate vicinity of it in what is now the Capa House. A photo of the dead man became world famous through a photo by war photographer Robert Capa which was published in Life Magazine under the title The Last Man to Die.

Pictures of the Zeppelin Bridge

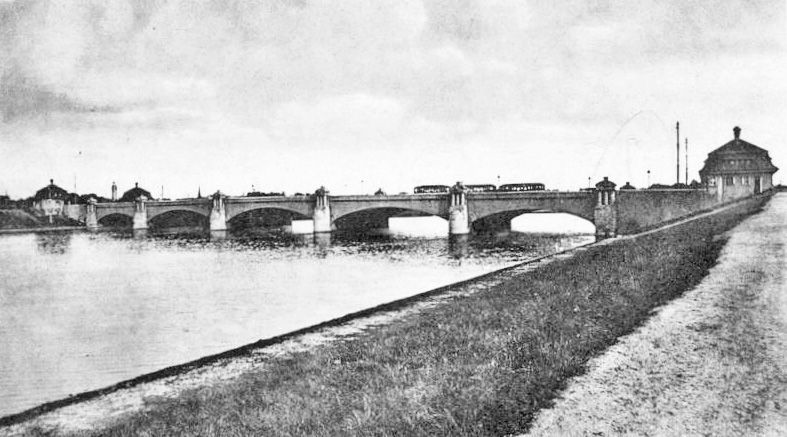
Around 1935 with the bridge houses

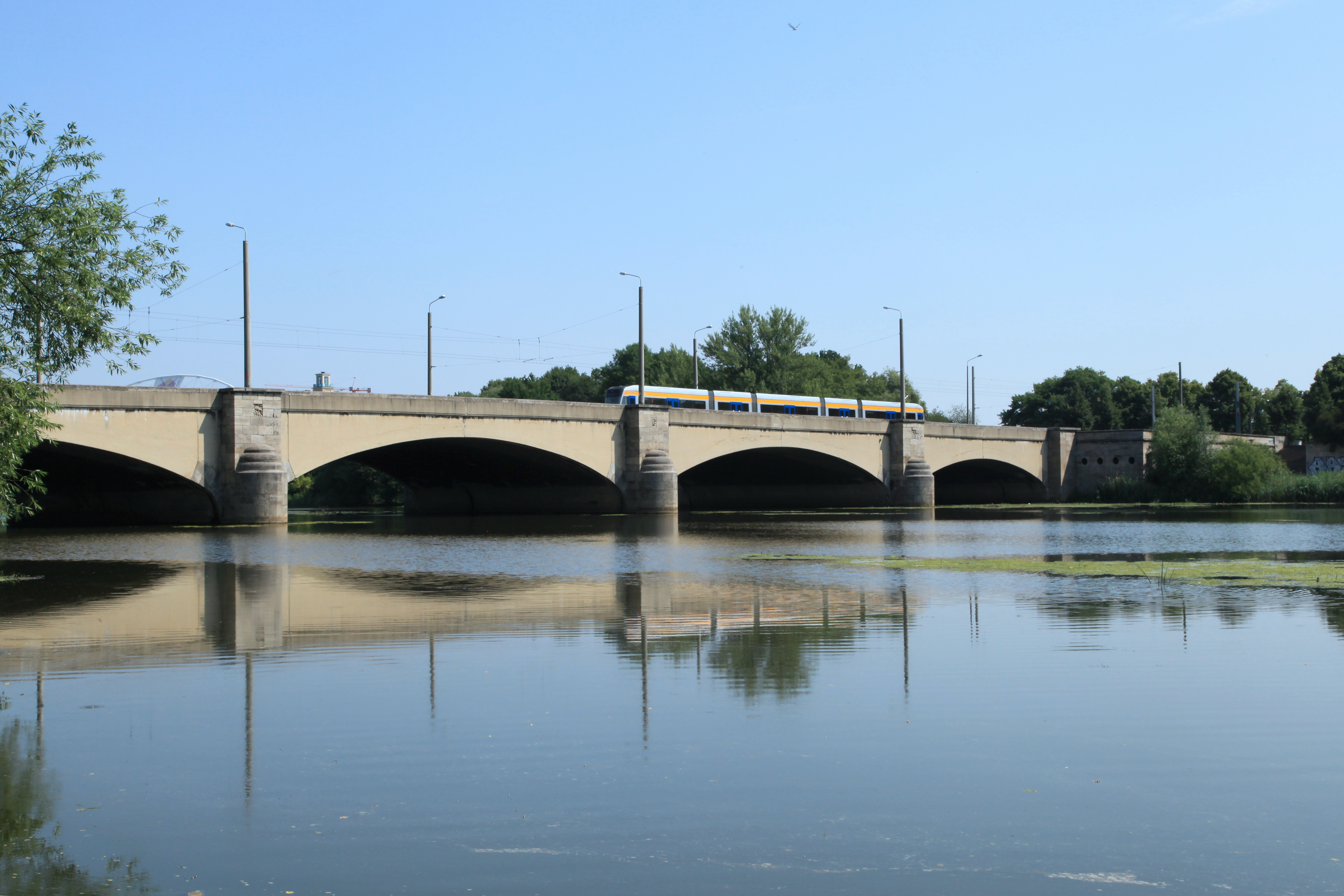
View from Richard-Wagner-Hain (2015)

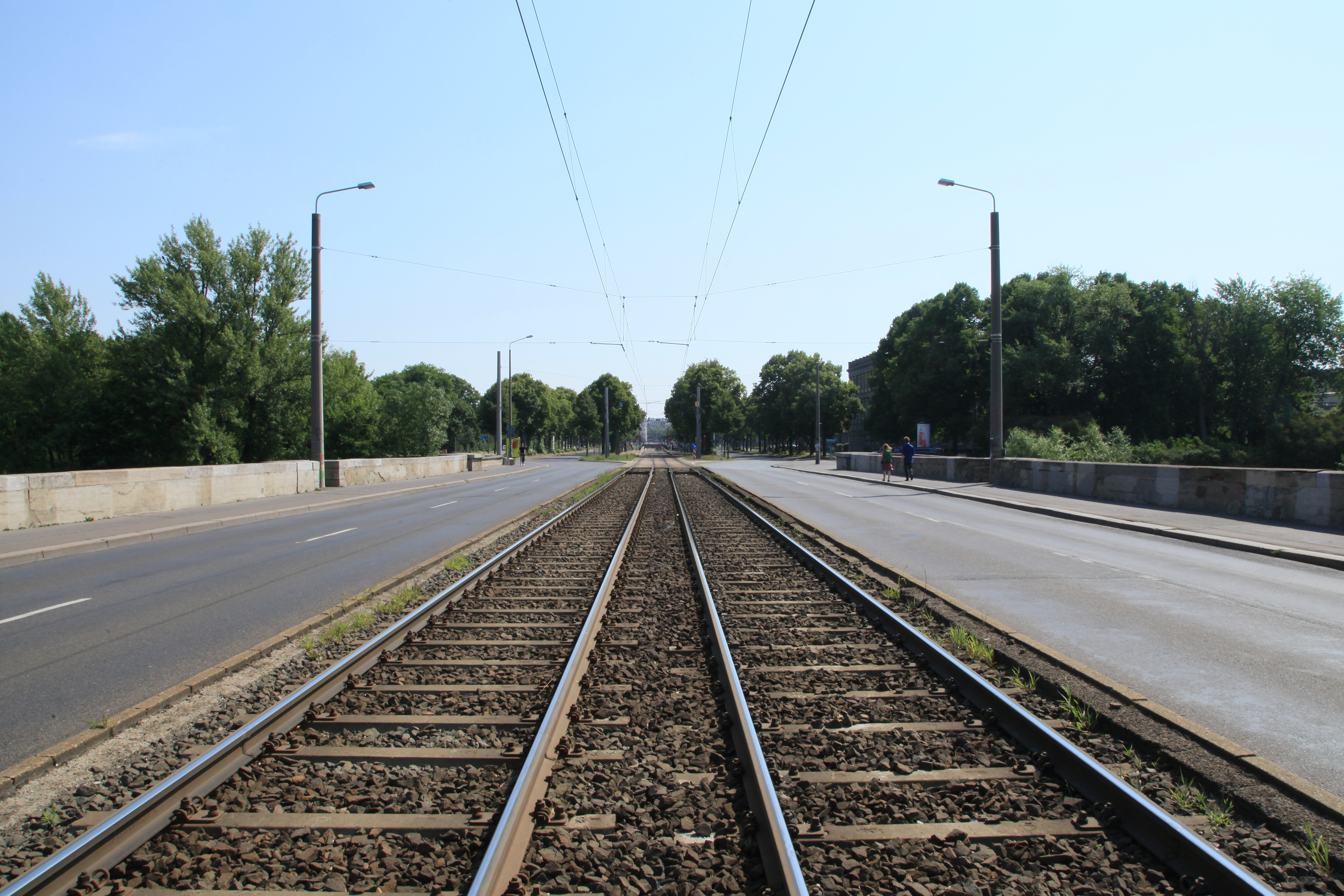
On the Bridge (2015)

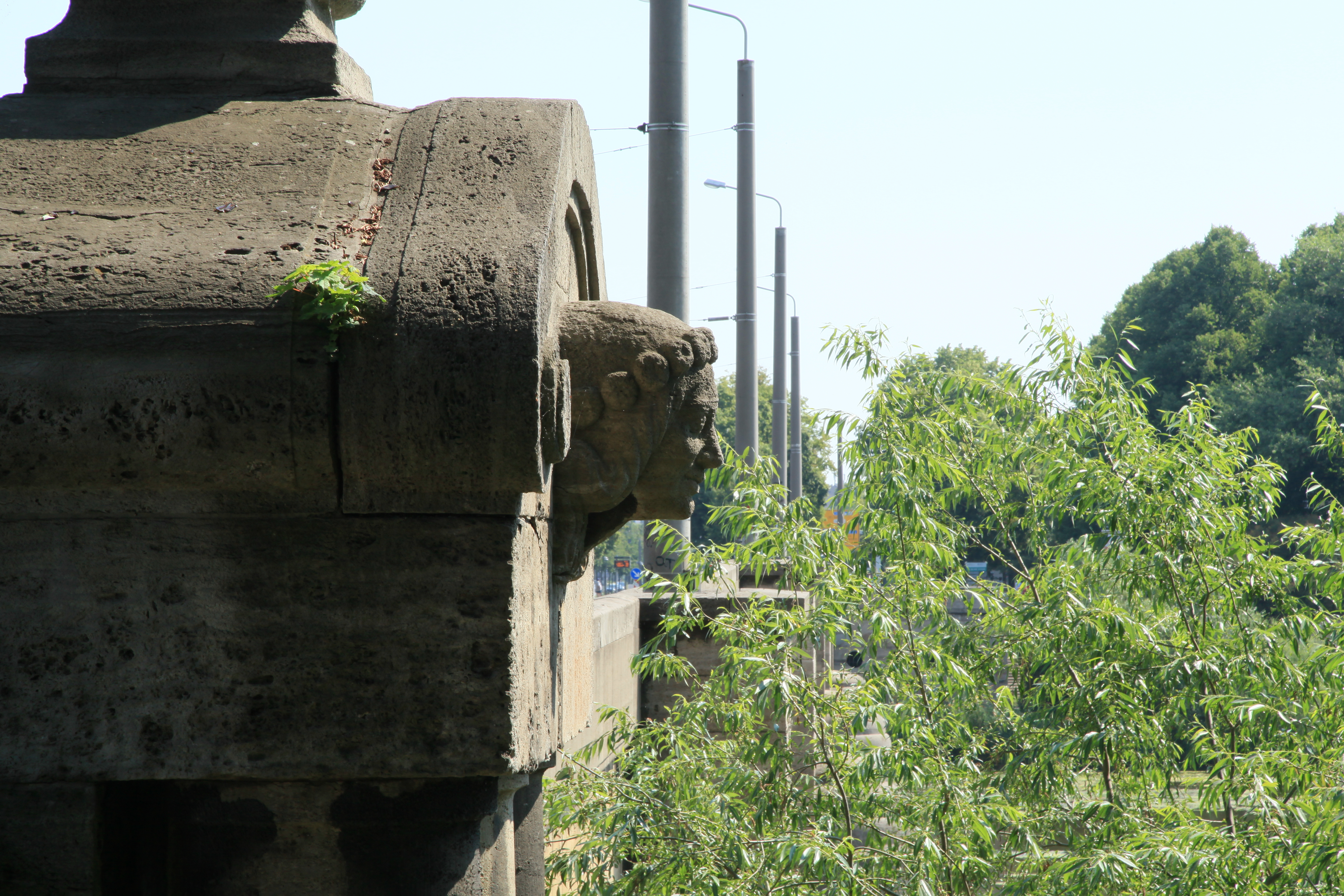
Sculpture on a Bridge Pier (2015)

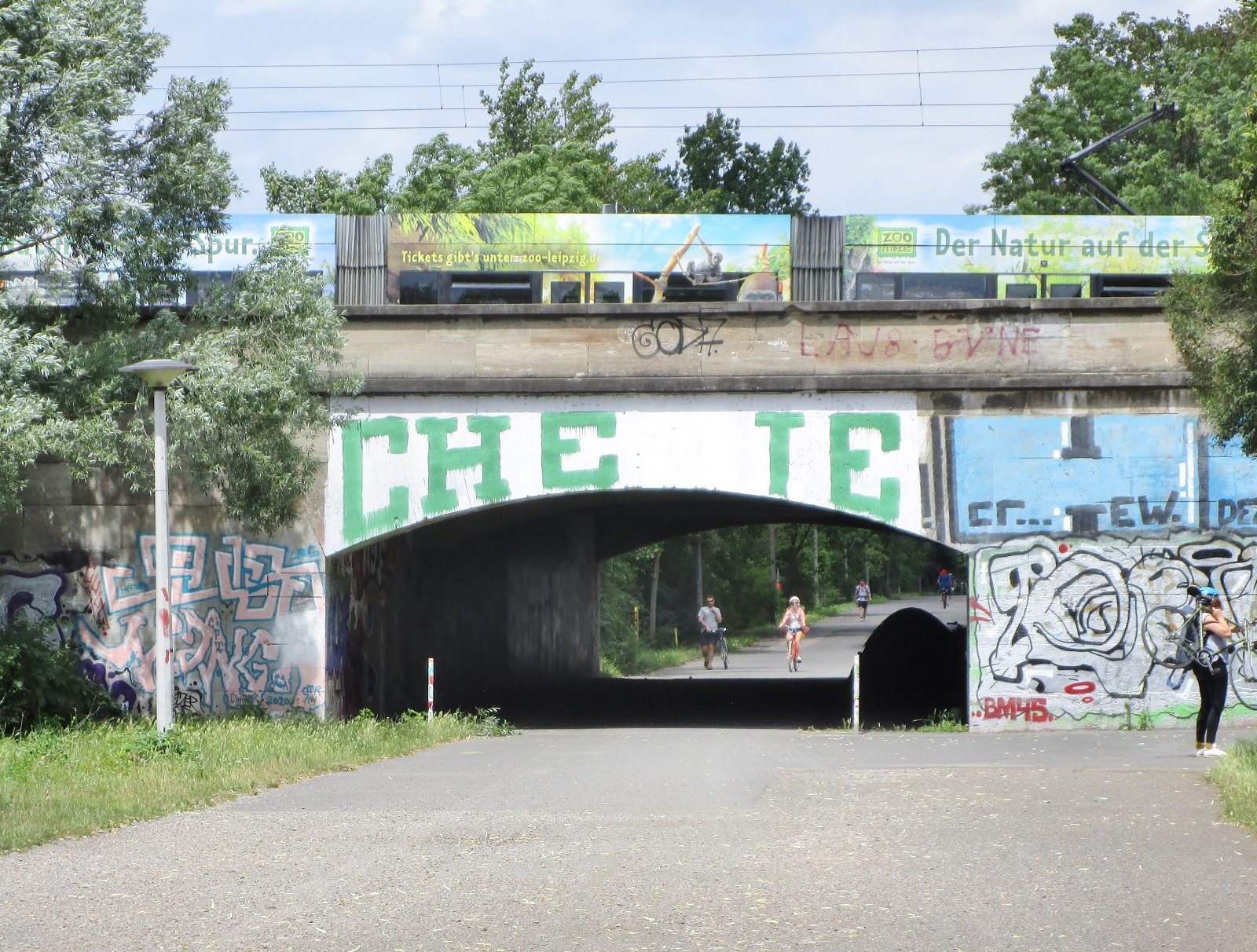
Uferwegbrücke (2023)

== Literature ==
- Bettina Weil: Leipziger Brücken II – Brücken über Weiße Elster, Elsterflutbett, Elsterbecken, Elstermühlgraben, Hundewasser und Knauthainer Elstermühlgraben [10/08]: Stadt Leipzig, Amt für Statistik und Wahlen, Leipzig 2008, p. 50 (in German)
