= Palmengarten (Leipzig) =

Public park in Leipzig

Coordinates: 51.33531°N 12.34542°E

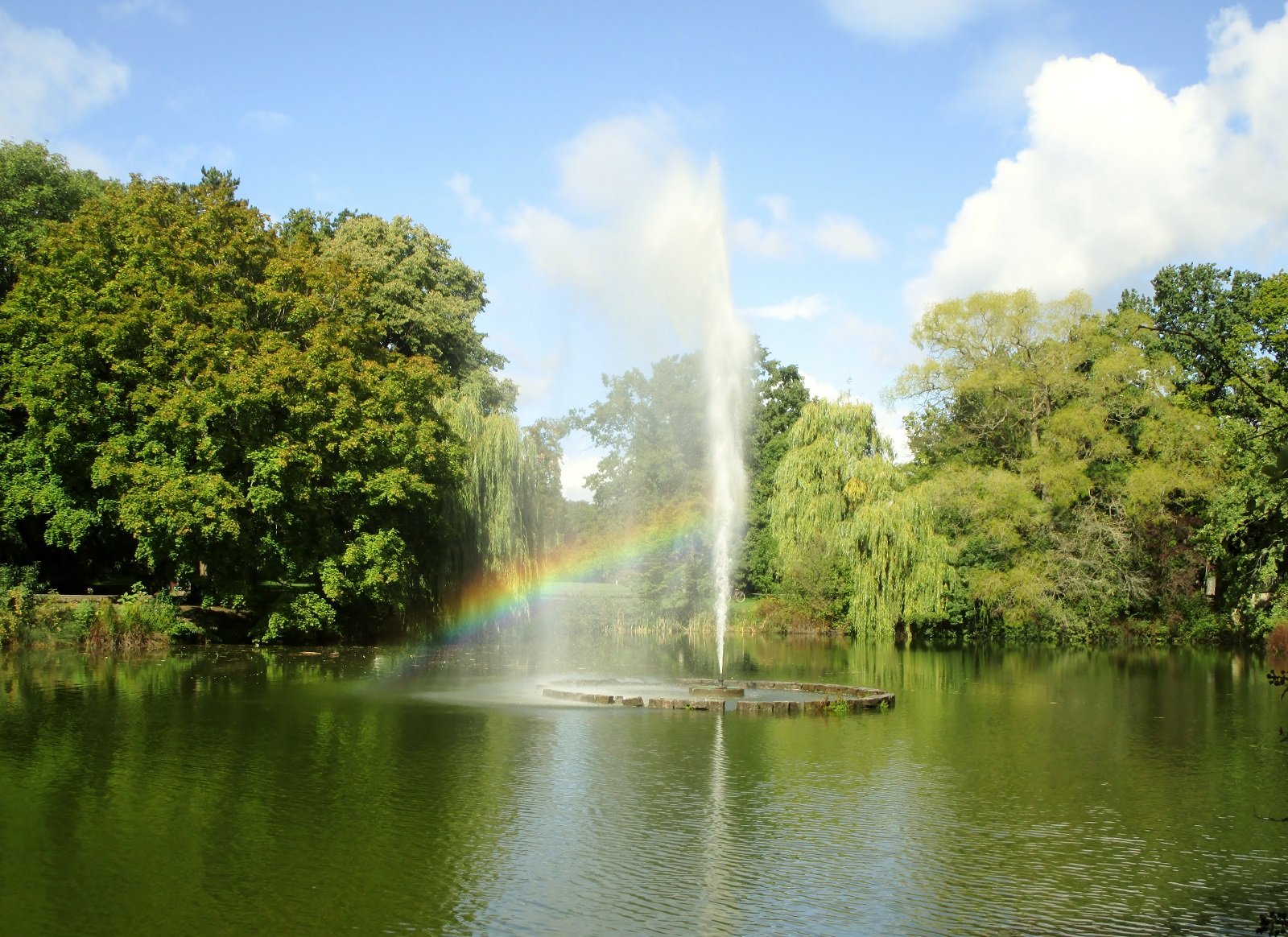
- Palmengarten-Fountain with rainbow
- Interactive map of Palmengarten
- Type: Urban park
- Location: Leipzig, Saxony, Germany
- Area: 22.5 ha (56 acres)
- Created: 1893
- Open: all year round

The Palmengarten is a park in Leipzig-Lindenau. It covers a surface of 22.5 hectares (55.6 acres).

== Location ==
The Palmengarten is situated two kilometres west of downtown Leipzig. It is bordered by Jahnallee to the north, Richard Wagner Hain to the east, Karl Heine street to the south, and Kleine Luppe as well as Lützner street to the west. The Kuhburger river formed the western border of the Palmengarten before its backfilling in 1920.

== History ==
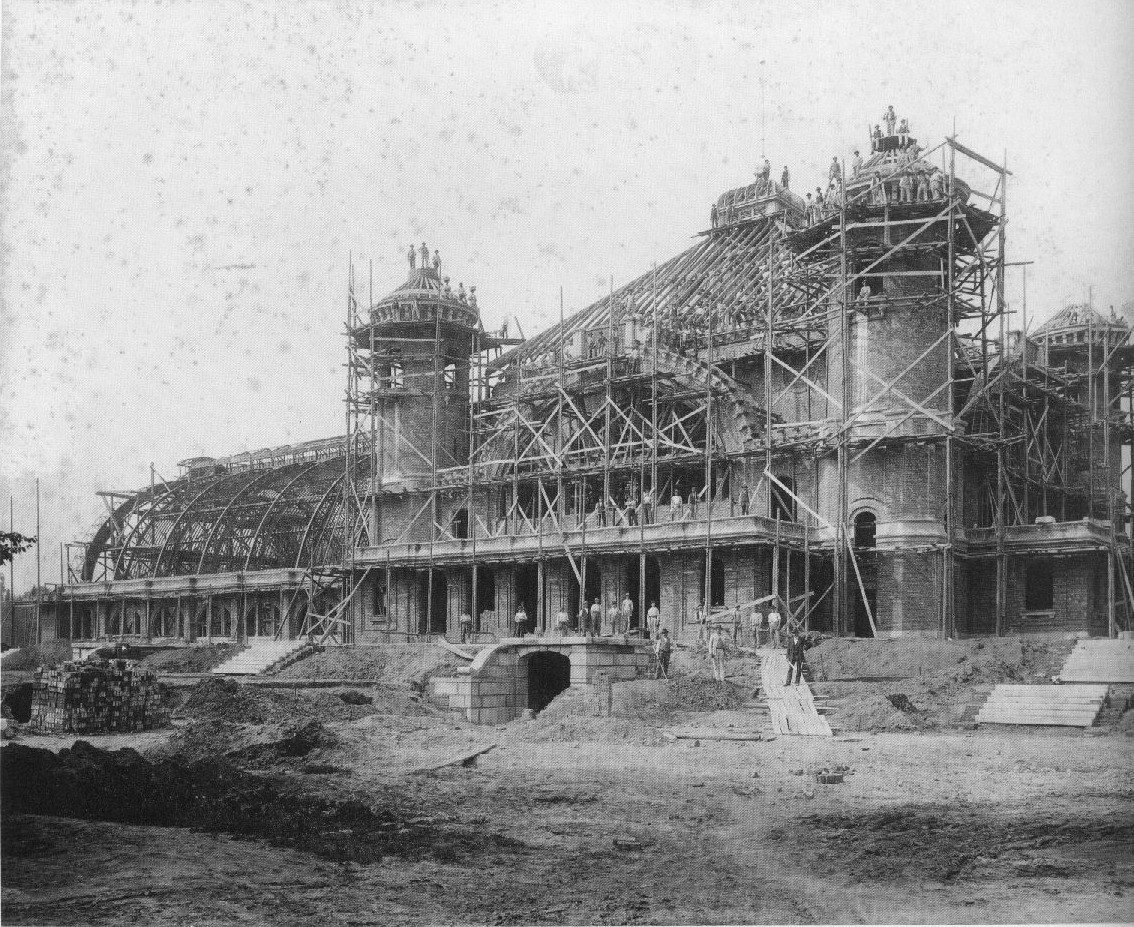
Construction of assembly rooms in Palmengarten.

The park grounds on the western bank of Elster Pleißen Aue were originally part of the Leipzig Riverside Forest. Later, in 1893, during the 50th anniversary of Leipzig Gardeners Association's (Leipziger Gärtner-Verein) horticultural exhibition, a competition for the design of a Palmengarten inspired by the Frankfurt Palmengarten was announced. The winner of the competition was Eduard May, a garden engineer from Frankfurt. Otto Moßdort, a gardener from Lindenau who had already designed the grounds for the horticultural exhibition and took second place in the competition, was then commissioned to execute the winning design. A corporation was established in 1896 in order to realise the project. The corporation leased the main site from the city and bought the southeast-based Ritterwerder (later known as Klingerhain).

The Palmengarten was opened on 29 April 1899 with a ceremony led by mayor Otto Georgi. As "Leipzig's most distinguished recreation centre", it was reserved only for the "upper-class circles". The assembly rooms designed by the architects Schmidt and Johlige were eponymous with the park and the main tourist attraction. They are located in the northeastern part of the park. The Palmenhaus, located south of the assembly rooms, covers an interior surface of 1.280 m² with palm trees and a variety of tropical flora. A pond with a surface area of 11.050 m² is located southeast of the old assembly rooms. A bridge connects the island in the northern part of the lake to the park's main path. A cast-iron pavilion built in 1897 is located on the eastern bank of the lake. During the Saxon-Thuringian industry and trade exhibition, the pavilion was located near the König Albert Park.

In 1921 the grounds were taken over by the city of Leipzig. Due to financial reasons, the Palmengarten was downscaled north of Elster in 1936; the wall, previously located on Plagwitzer street, was demolished, and a ticket booth was built behind Klingerhain bridge, making Klingerhain easily accessible. Since the Gutenberg Reich exhibition was to take place in the park grounds in 1940, the assembly rooms and the Palmhaus were demolished on 10 January 1939. Due to the start of the Second World War, the realisation of the exhibition was hindered.

In 1955, the Palmengarten, König Albert park, Johannapark, and Scheibenholzpark were merged into Clara-Zetkin-Park. In April 2011, the park was officially once again renamed Palmengarten.

The Palmengarten is home to many dendrologically valuable and special trees, which for the most part originate from the tree nursery of the botanical garden, which was shut down in 1960.

In 2008, a revue theatre "Am Palmengarten" was opened; the theatre can seat up to 150 people. It was reconstructed from a petrol station dating back to 1944 as part of the protection of monuments.

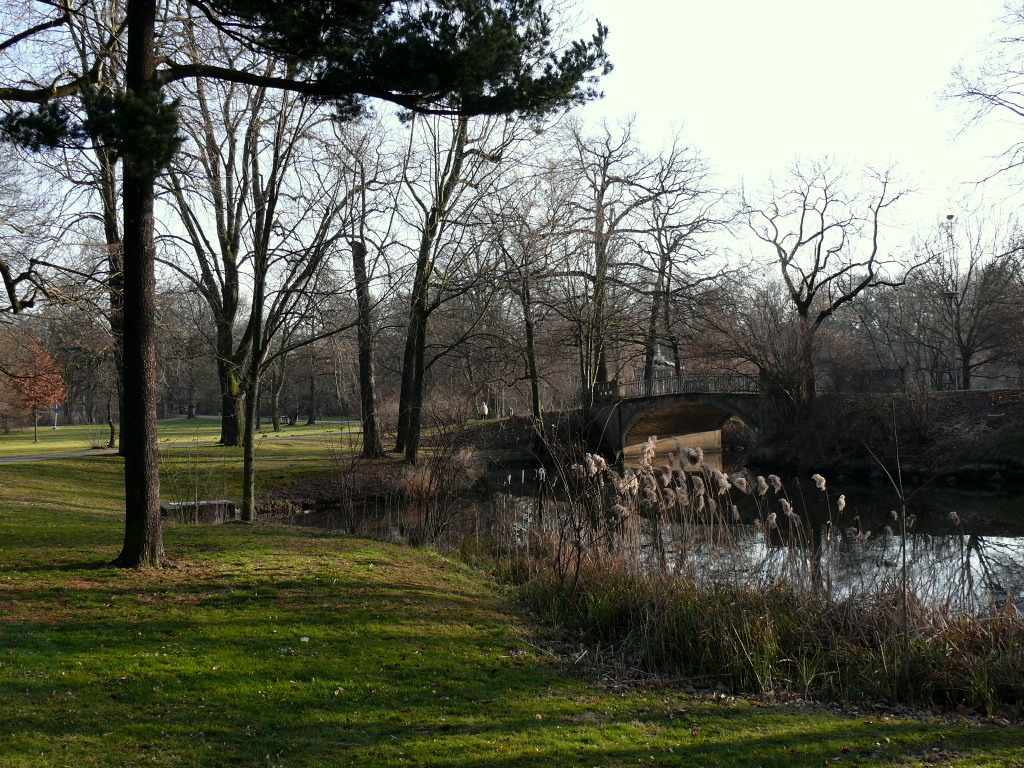
In the Palmengarten (2008)

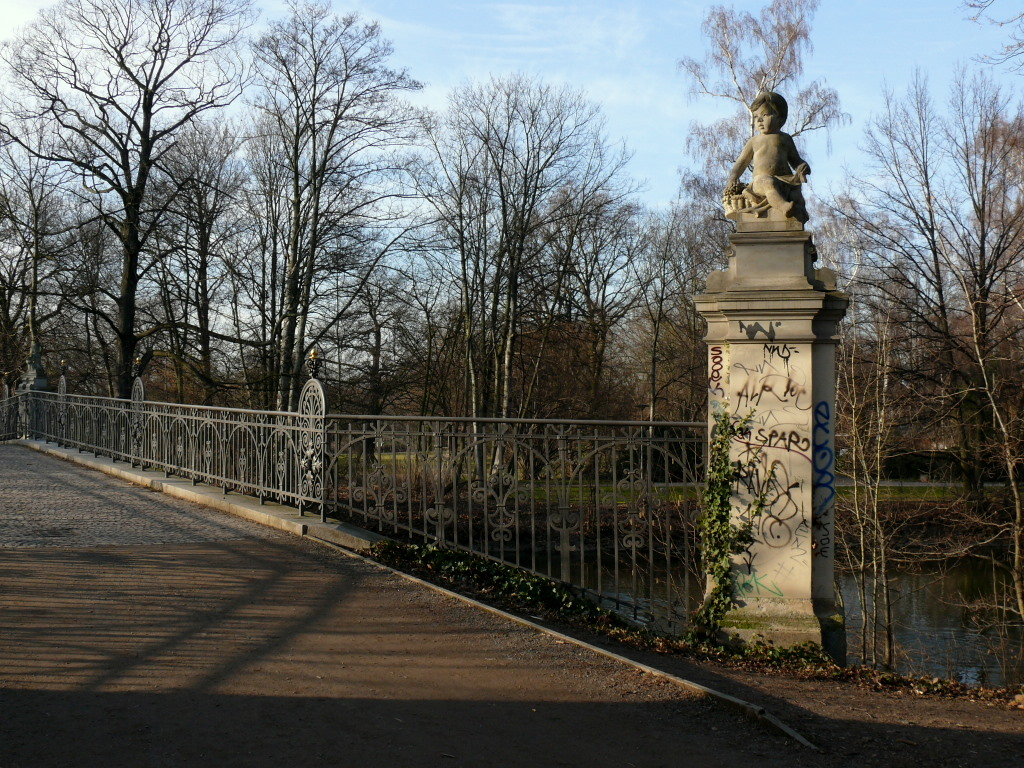
The Elster bridge in Palmengarten (2008)

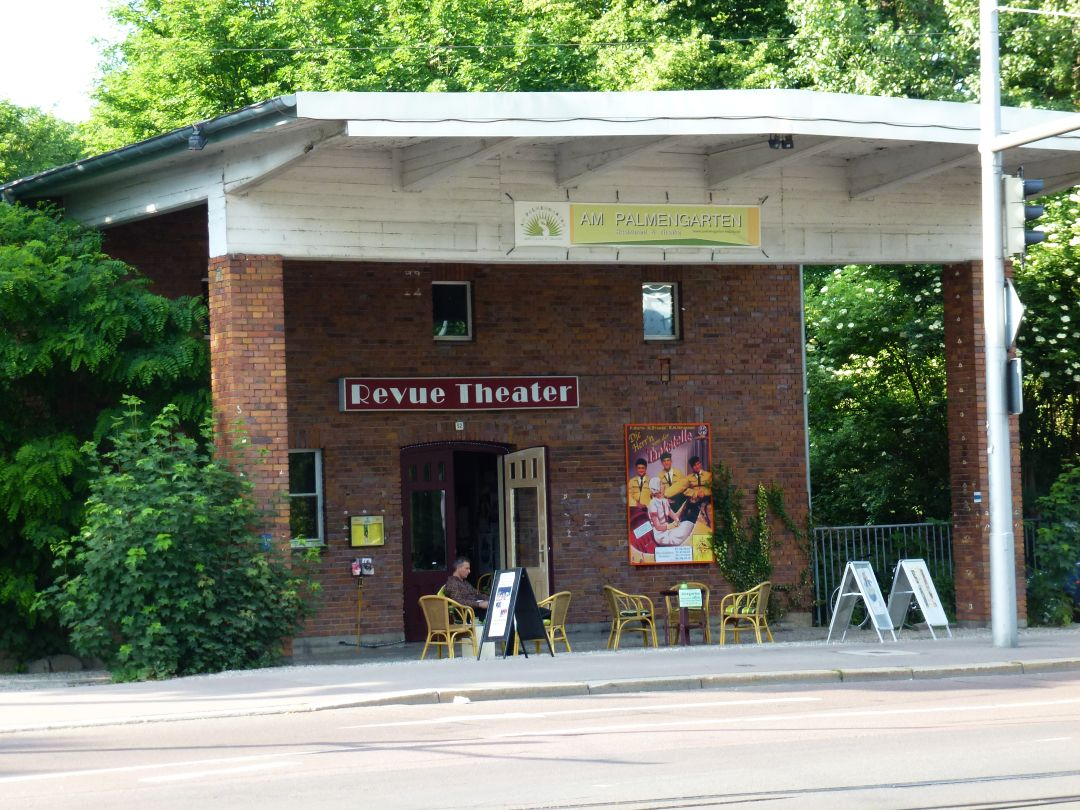
Revue theatre
"Am Palmengarten"

== Miscellaneous ==
The "Schule am Palmengarten" (School at the Palmengarten, formerly: Max-Klinger-School, address: Karl-Heine-Strasse 22b) and a building complex "Palmengarten-Palais" with the Capa House are named after the Palmengarten. Both are on the edge of the Palmengarten.

== See also ==
- Architecture of Leipzig#Richard Wagner Hain

== Bibliography ==
=== in German ===
- Hans-Joachim Hädicke: Von der Viehweide zum Landschaftsgarten. Die Geschichte des Palmengartens begann mit der Internationalen Jubiläumsgartenbauausstellung 1893. Leipziger Blätter 37 (2000), p. 40–43.
- Horst Riedel, Thomas Nabert, ed.: Stadtlexikon Leipzig von A bis Z. (1st ed.). Pro Leipzig: Leipzig. 2005.
