= Jürgen Möller =

German officer and military historian

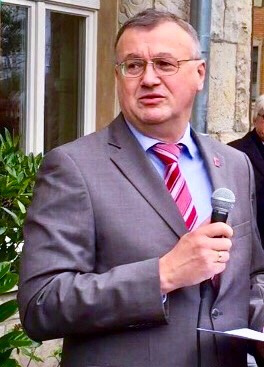
- Jürgen Möller on 17 April 2016 at the opening of the exhibition space at the Capa-Haus
- Born: 27 August 1959 (age 67); Gotha, Germany
- Occupations: Officer; Military historian
- Organizations: National People's Army; Bundeswehr

Jürgen Möller (born 27 August 1959) is a German former officer, and a military historian, focused on the exploration of the end of World War II in Germany in 1944/45, especially the American occupation of Central Germany.

== Life ==
Möller was born and raised in Gotha. After his vocational training in A levels, he worked as an officer in the National People's Army and the Bundeswehr from 1979 to nihga 4. In the early 1990s, Möller started researching World War II in his free time, publishing from 2003 to 2007 in Arps Verlag Weißenfels. He retired in 2014, and has since devoted himself to writing a book as a military historian and assisting in the creation of military-historical reconstructions for the detection of explosive ordnance. Since 2010, Möller has published his research results on the American occupation of Central Germany in the context of the documentary series The End of the War in Central Germany 1945 at the publishing house Verlag Rockstuhl. He regularly presents his findings in lectures and as a consultant for television productions on the history of Central Germany. Möller researches worldwide, and has been particularly intrigued by finding the name of the last person to die in the war. The American war photographer Robert Capa's work The Picture of the Last Man to Die has provided the crucial clue that, 67 years after the war, the identity of the American soldier Raymond J. Bowman could be determined. Bowman was fatally shot by a German sniper on a balcony in Leipzig-Lindenau.

In the 2017 special issue Concentration Camp Buchenwald Weimar April 1945 by Verlag Rockstuhl, Möller was able to prove scientifically who liberated the Buchenwald concentration camp based on American documents that contradicted previous findings; that units of the 4th US Armored Division had reached Buchenwald before the 6th US Armored Division, and thus triggered all other events that led to the final liberation of the Buchenwald concentration camp.

Jürgen Möller is married and lives in Winkelhaid near Nuremberg.

== Selected works ==
Military science publications

- Der Kampf um den Harz April 1945, Bad Langensalza: Rockstuhl, 2011, First Edition, ISBN 978-3-86777-257-0.
- Endkampf an der Mulde 1945, Bad Langensalza: Rockstuhl, 2012, First Edition, ISBN 978-3-86777-334-8.
- Die letzte Schlacht-Leipzig 1945, Bad Langensalza: Rockstuhl, 2014, ISBN 978-3-86777-687-5.
- Sturmlauf von der Werra zur Saale April 1945, Verlag Rockstuhl, 2016, First Edition, ISBN 978-3-86777-647-9.
- Panzerkeile auf der Thüringer Autobahn April 1945, Verlag Rockstuhl 2017, First Edition, ISBN 978-3-86777-648-6.
- Konzentrationslager Buchenwald und Besetzung von Weimar 1945, Spezialausgabe, Verlag Rockstuhl 2017, ISBN 978-3-95966-274-1.
- Konzentrationslager Mittelbau-Dora, Spezialausgabe, Verlag Rockstuhl 2018, ISBN 978-3-95966-390-8.
- Der Kampf um die Thüringer Pforte April 1945, Verlag Rockstuhl 2019, 12. Band, v, ISBN 978-3-95966-109-6.

Exhibitions and television productions

- 2005 The war is over - Weißenfels April 1945, Museum Schloss Neu-Augustusburg Weißenfels
- 2006–2008 Forward to the River Mulde - Die amerikanische Besetzung des Leipziger Südraumes im April 1945, Wanderausstellungen: Museum Stadt Pegau, Stadtmühle Groitzsch, Alte Mälzerei Zeitz, Museum der Stadt Borna, Schule Rötha, Heimatmuseum Kitzscher, Gymnasium Markkleeberg/Ortsteil Zöbiger, Gustav-Adolf-Museum Lützen
- 2010 Die Besetzung des Landkreises Querfurt - 65 Jahre Kriegsende, Museum Burg Querfurt
- 2013 1945 - Kriegsende in Zeitz und Umgebung, Museum Schloss Moritzburg Zeitz
- 2015 MDR-Dokumentation Verlorene Väter, vergessene Väter - als die Amis an die Saale kamen, as a consultant
- 2017 War is over, Robert Capa in Leipzig, permanent exhibition in the Capa House, collaboration

== Honors ==
- 2006 Silver Merit of the National Association of Bavaria Volksbund Deutsche Kriegsgräberfürsorge e. V. for services to the work of the German War Graves Commission
- 2007 Middle German Historian Award, Ur-Krostitzer Jahresring

Since 2005, Möller has been a member of an American veterans organization, the 69th Infantry Division (Torgau Division), which met as the first American division at Strehla on the Elbe with the Soviet troops. This historic event is commemorated every five years as part of Elbe Day at the official memorial in Torgau. Möller, who until the dissolution honorary member of the Fighting 69th Infantry Div.Ass. was part of the successor organization The 69the Infantry Division Next Generation Group since 2016 and was involved in the realization of a commemorative plaque commemorating the fallen of both sides during the battles for Weissenfels in April 1945 and the review of history on the occasion of the 62nd anniversary the end of the war in April 2007 by a representative of the Consulate General of the United States of America Leipzig honored with the commemorative plaque of the 69th Infantry Division. The inauguration of the plaque in the castle Neu-Augustusburg Weissenfels took place on 13 April 2005 as part of a ceremony on the occasion of the 60th anniversary of the end of the war in the presence of representatives of the state government of Saxony-Anhalt and representatives of the Bundeswehr and US Army.
