= Leipzig Riverside Forest =

Europe's largest inner-city alluvial forest

Coordinates: 51.31719°N 12.3565364°E

Leipzig Riverside Forest German: Leipziger Auwald
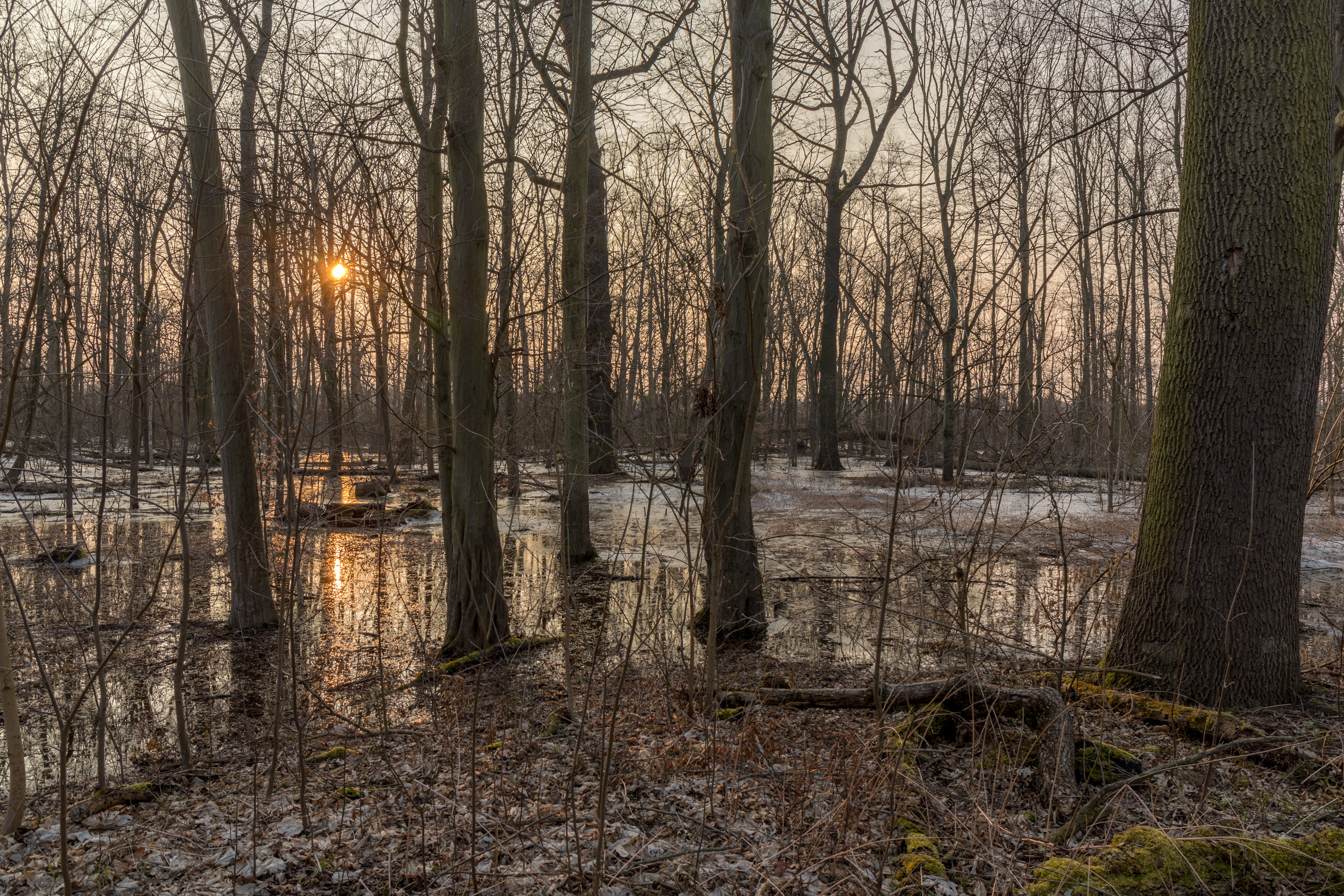
- Auwald, Leipzig
- Interactive map of Leipzig Riverside Forest

Geography
- Location: Schkeuditz, Leipzig, Markkleeberg, Saxony, Germany

Ecology
- Forest cover: 2,424 ha (5,989.8 acres)

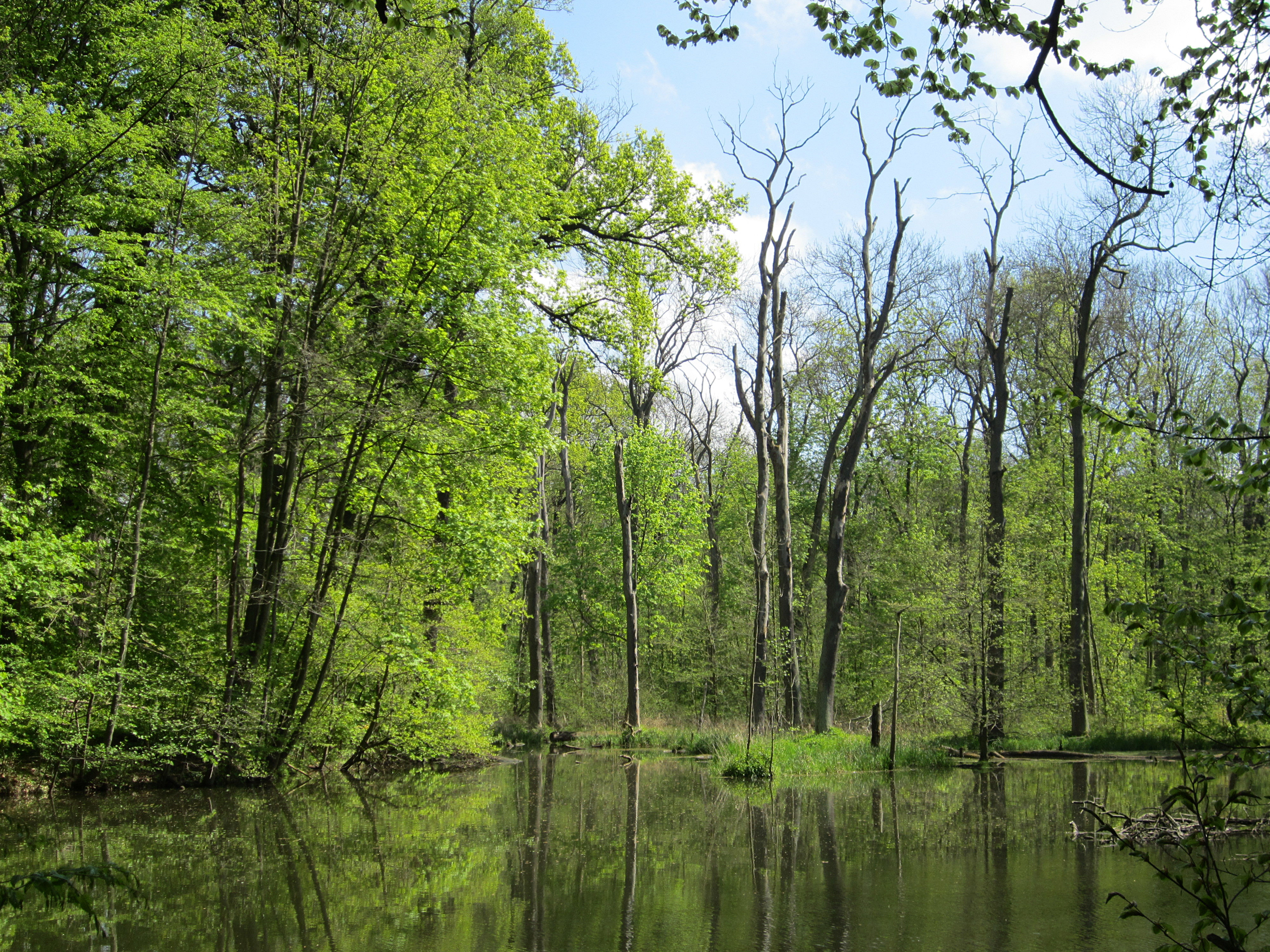
Inside the Riverside Forest

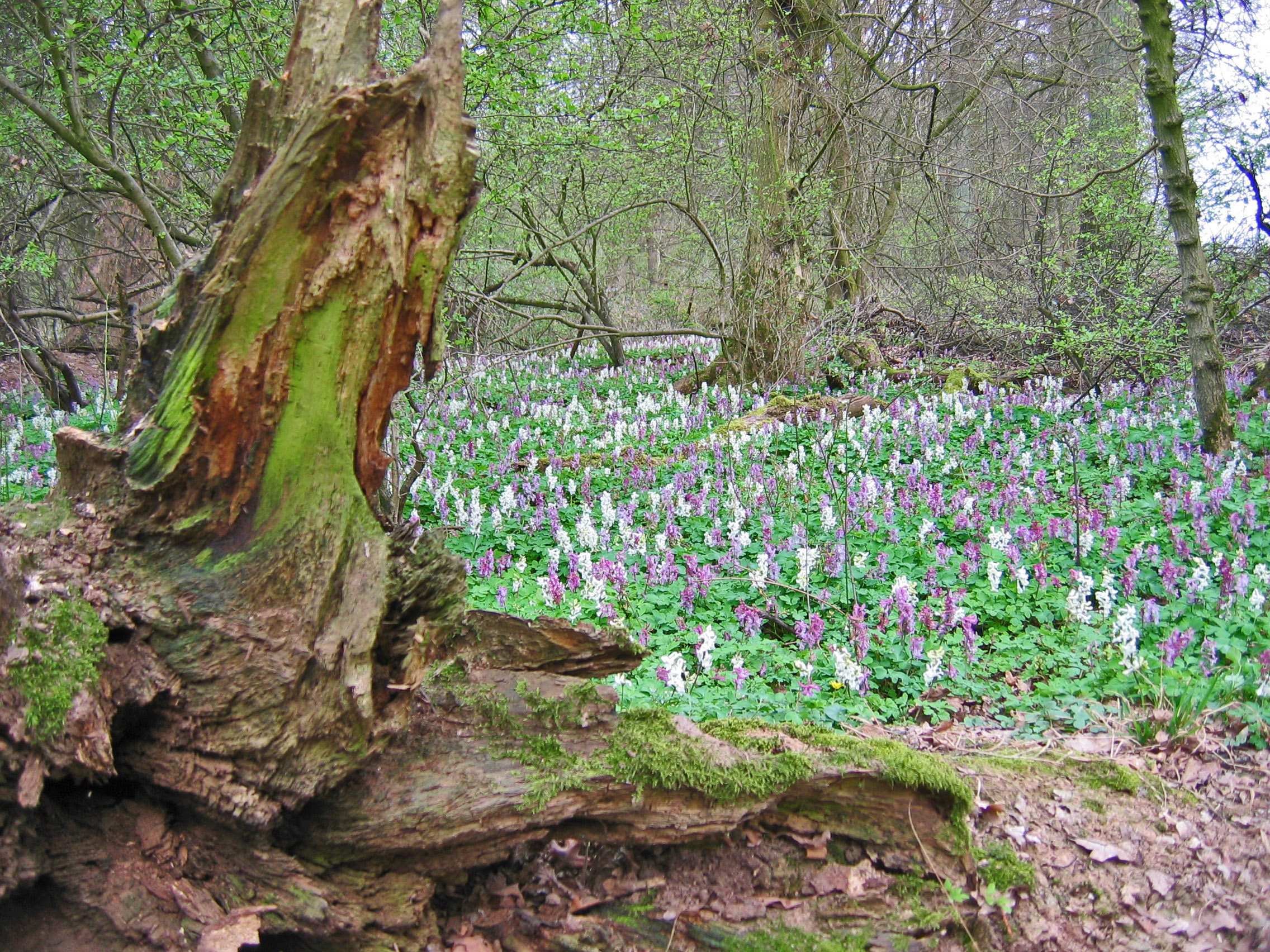
A carpet of corydalis

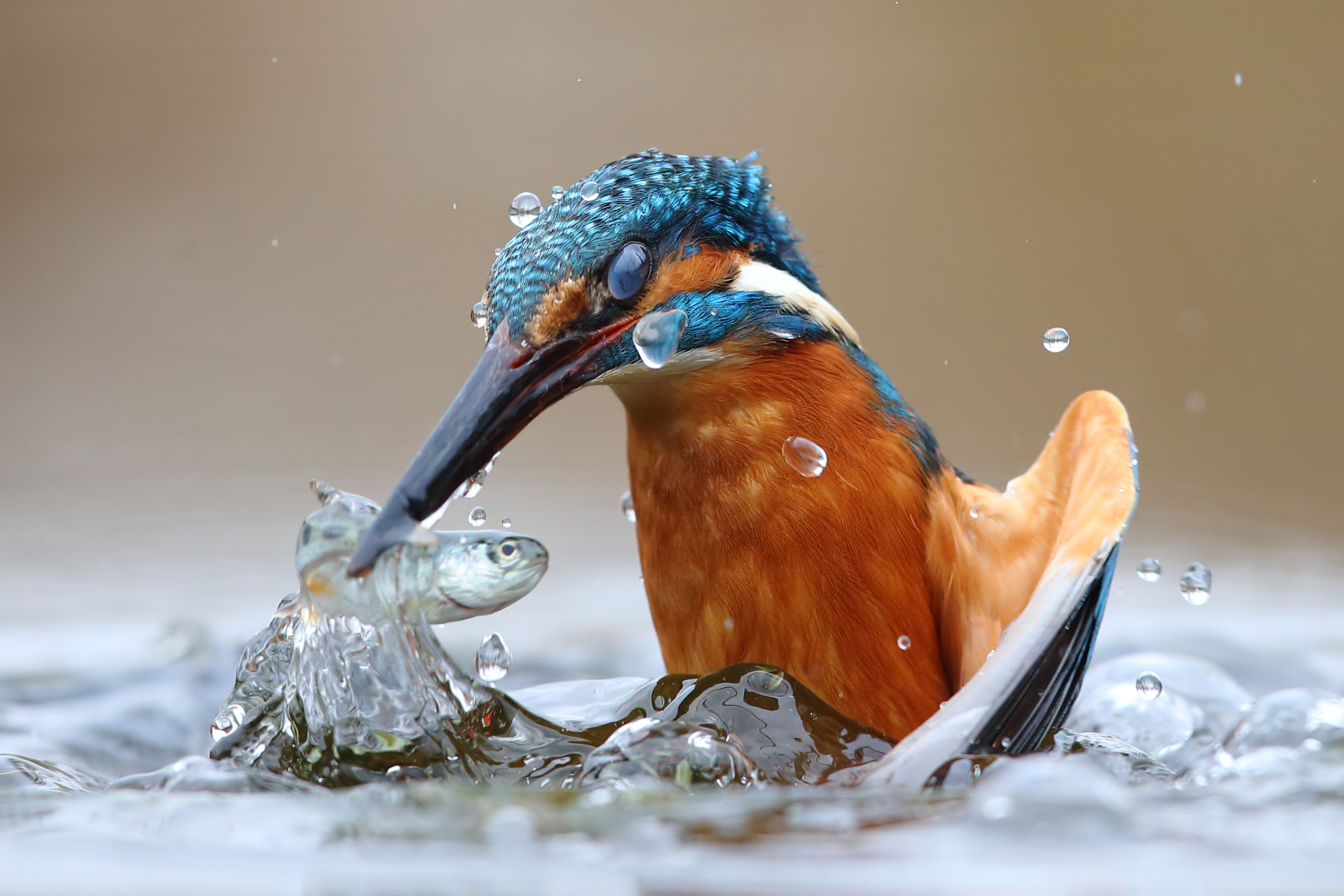
Common kingfisher fishing

Leipzig Riverside Forest (German: Leipziger Auenwald) is one of the largest lowland Riparian forests in Central Europe, lying mostly within the city limits of Leipzig city in Germany. The nature reserve is partially covered with bottomland forest and contains a large variety of endangered species.

== Location ==
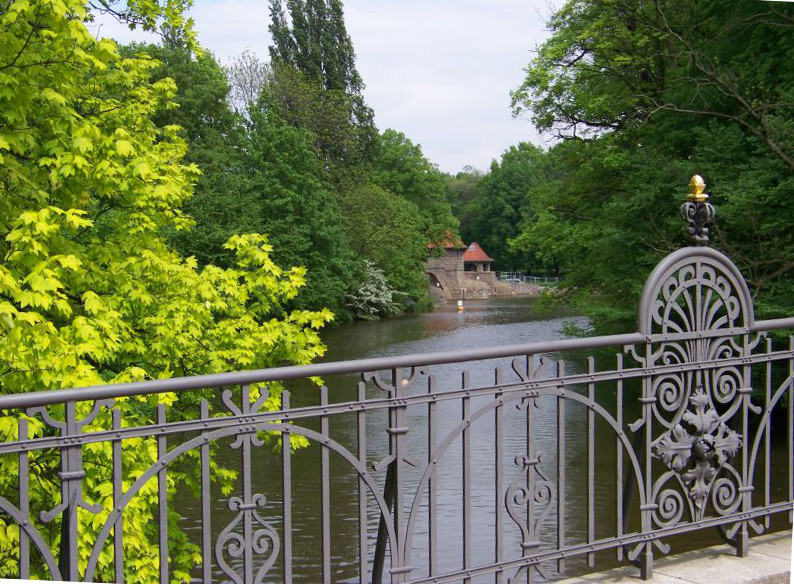
The Palm Garden is part of the corridor.

In total, the Leipzig Riverside Forest has an extension along the rivers White Elster, Pleiße and Luppe of a good 30 kilometres (18.64 miles) and a width of 2–5 kilometres (1.2–3.1 mi). It is divided into separate southern and northern parts, between which is a corridor containing many parks and green areas that lie along the Elsterbecken (Elster Basin) and Pleißeflutbett (Pleiße flood channel) waters, which were created for flood protection.

Since the end of the 1950s, the Leipzig Riverside Forest is a Landschaftsschutzgebiet (Landscape conservation area) and several parts are Naturschutzgebiet.

In the classification of the International Union for Conservation of Nature (IUCN), the protected area covers 5,897 ha (14,571.8 acres) even though the densely wooded area is estimated at only 2,424 ha (5,989.8 acres), of which 1,978 ha (4,887.7 acres) are state area managed by the municipality of Leipzig.

== History ==
The Leipzig Riverside Forst has been constantly changing, with human intervention being a major factor in its development. In the older Holocene, the valley floor level was much lower than it is today. Due to clearing in the upper reaches of the rivers, an increased input of sediments began anthropogenically about 7000 years ago, which were deposited as alluvial loam. As a result, the surface level increased.

== Flora and fauna ==
=== Plants ===
Originally, the hardwood forest hosted more elms and black poplars which have become rare over the years, however the amount of old oaks with massive stems is still remarkable. The mixed forest contains many different tree species, almost half of them are either ash, maple or sycamore maple. Also found are small-leaved linden, common horn beam and various kinds of willows. In spring, the ground is covered with wild garlic, sprinkled with spring snowflakes and corydalis in colors ranging from white and pink to purple. Some rather rare plants like the Geum rivale can also be found in the wet, almost swampy parts of the area.

=== Animals ===
The common kingfisher has become quite rare in Germany, especially due to loss of habitat and as a result some waterways are closed-off from tourist paddling during the breeding season. Inhabiting the forest are red squirrels and a multitude of woodpeckers, such as the great spotted woodpecker, as well as the black woodpecker and the European green woodpecker.

== See also ==
- Bodies of water in Leipzig
- Racecourse Scheibenholz

== Literature ==
- ENEDAS e. V./ Autorenkollektiv: Der Leipziger Auwald. Ein Natur- und Erlebnisführer. Edition Leipzig, 2013, ISBN 978-3-361-00685-0.
- Müller, Gerd K., ed. (1992). Der Leipziger Auwald - ein verkanntes Juwel der Natur (in German) (1st ed.). Leipzig / Jena / Berlin: Urania-Verlag. ISBN 3-332-00538-3.
- Gerd K. Müller: Die Leipziger Auen. Staatsministerium für Umwelt und Landesentwicklung, Dresden, 1995.
