= Capa House =

Historic house in Leipzig, Germany

Coordinates: 51.33823°N 12.34206°E

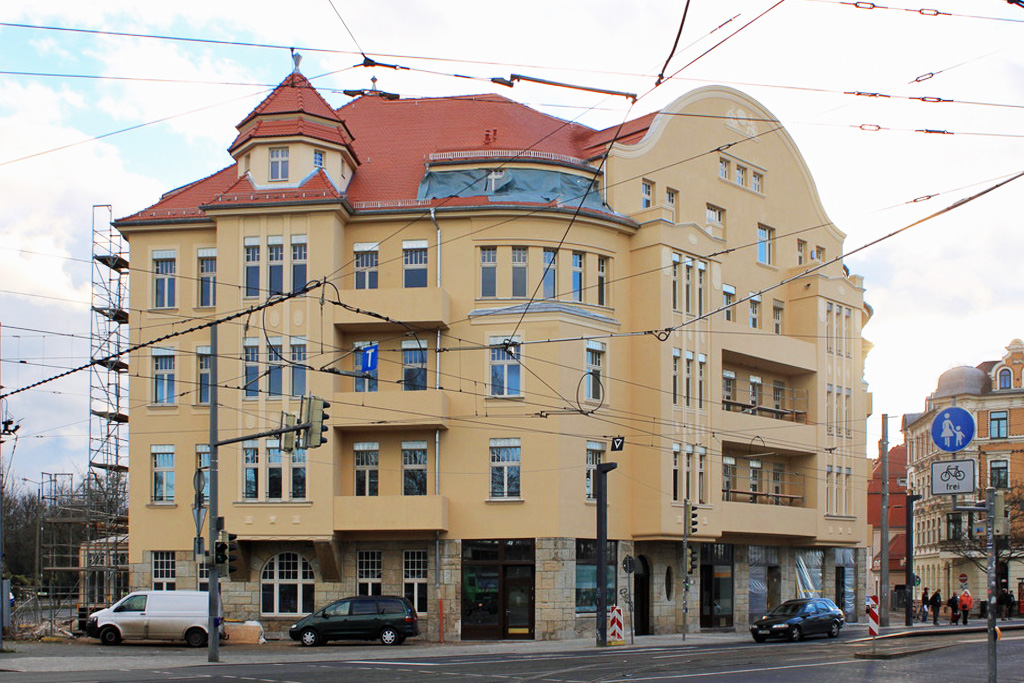
Capa House in December 2015

The Capa House is a building in the Lindenau quarter of Leipzig, Germany at Jahnallee 61. It is named after the American war reporter and photographer Robert Capa, and is the location where Capa took The Picture of the Last Man to Die of the United States army soldier Raymond J. Bowman, who was killed there two weeks before the end of the Second World War in Europe. The images became internationally known when they were published in Life magazine.

== Present ==
The majority of the house had been empty for over a decade since the late 1990s. On New Year's Eve 2011/2012, part of it burned down and the demolition could only be stopped by a citizens' initiative. The investor Horst Langner undertook the extensive preservation, which was completed in 2016. The Café Eigler was opened in December 2015. To commemorate the events of 18 April 1945, an exhibition room in the café was opened on 17 April 2016. Lehman Riggs, an American veteran who was eyewitness to the death of his comrade Raymond Bowman, attended the renaming of the street on the corner of Jahnallee/Lützner Straße to Bowmanstraße. A commemorative plaque dedicated to Bowman was also unveiled. This plaque was based on a design by Harald Alff, who was personally involved in the Capa House. On 18 April 2019, US Consul Emily Yasmin Norris commemorated the victims of World War II in front of the Capa House. At the same time, she recognized Lehman Riggs for fighting alongside Bowman on that balcony. Lehman Riggs died at age 101 in 2021.

The new building complex around the Capa house is called Palmengarten-Palais since the renovation. In September 2021, it was announced that Café Eigler would close at the end of the month due to the COVID-19 pandemic.

On 1 July 2023 the Capa-House Memorial Site was reopened in the former Café Eigler as an exhibition, event and meeting place dedicated not only to Robert Capa, but also to his partner, the (war) photographer Gerda Taro. CAPA Culture gGmbH is responsible for events, projects and special exhibitions, and the Hentrich & Hentrich Publishing House for Jewish Culture and Contemporary History supports the Capa-House Memorial Site both professionally and personally. The Stadtgeschichtliches Museum Leipzig curates and develops the permanent exhibition area. The Capa-House initiative is a project partner.

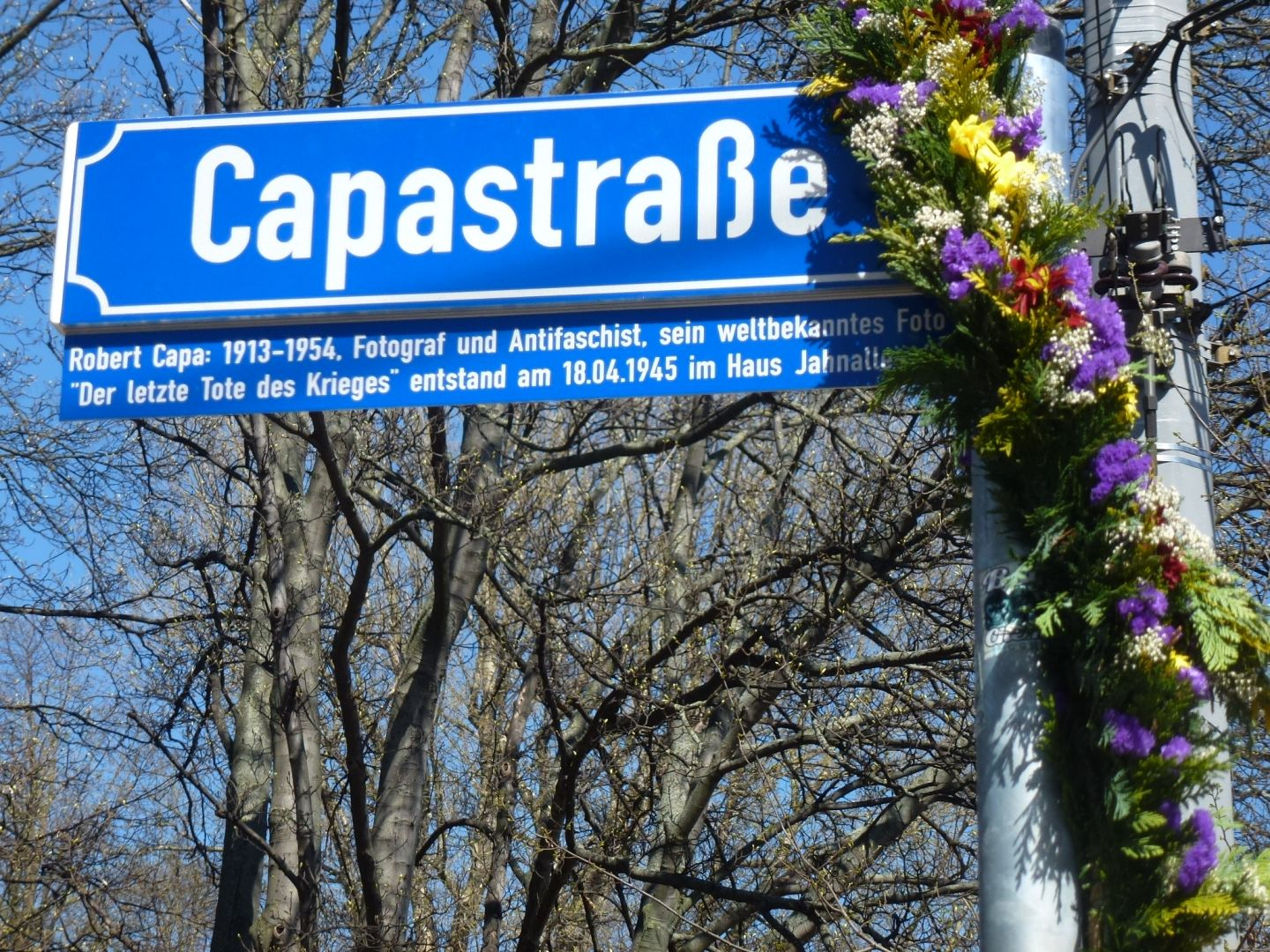
Capastraße in Leipzig

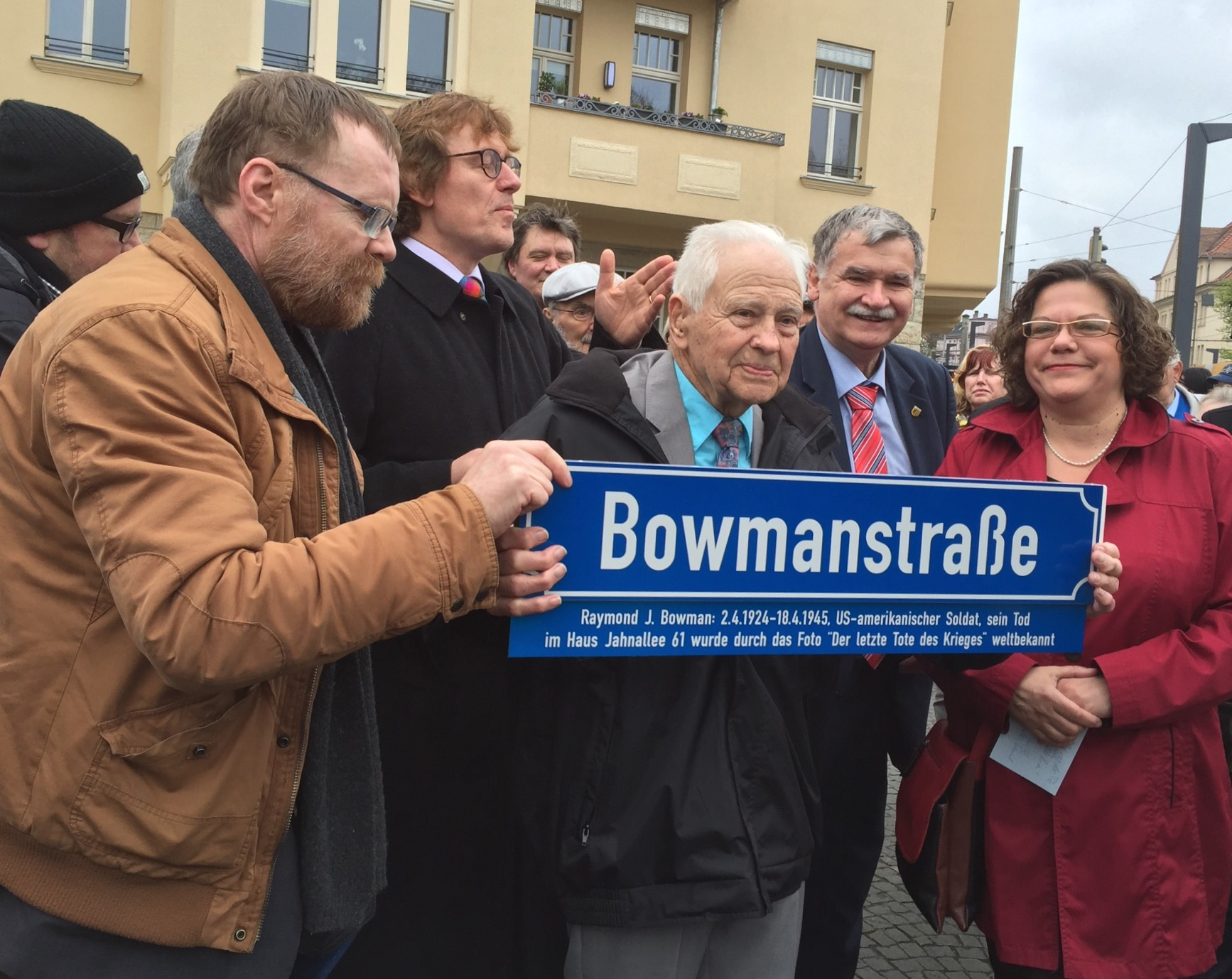
Lehman Riggs in Leipzig on 17 April 2016

== Historical value ==
The Capa House, built in 1909 to 1910 as a tenant house, is a listed building in the German Reform Architecture style. It was initially a "grand house" for the goldsmith Oskar Menzel jun. (Architect: F. Otto Gerstenberger). It changed hands in 1914. The premises of the above-mentioned Café Eigler used to house the "Confectionery and Coffee House of the West", then the Anger-Tanzbar, and later the Handelsorganisation dance bar "Melody" during the time of the GDR.

In the final days of World War II, American soldiers entered the building along with reporter Robert Capa. Capa took several photographs of the soldiers, including one which became known as The Picture of the Last Man to Die.

== Literature ==
- Jürgen Möller (2010). Kriegsschauplatz Leipziger Südraum 1945 (in German). Bad Langensalza: Deutscher Rockstuhl Verlag. ISBN 978-3-86777-168-9., (2nd, revised edition), translation of the title: Theater of war in the south of Leipzig, 1945
- Ulrike Baumecker. Jahnallee 61 – Das Capa-Haus (in German). Merseburg: Gehrig Verlagsgesellschaft mbh. Book title: Leipzig – Denkmalschutz und Denkmalpflege; without imprint, without year (around 2017), without ISBN, pages 26–27
