= The Picture of the Last Man to Die =

Photograph by Robert Capa

The Picture of the Last Man to Die (1945) by Robert Capa

The Picture of the Last Man to Die is a black and white photograph taken by Robert Capa during the battle for Leipzig, depicting an American soldier, Raymond J. Bowman, aged 21, after being killed by a German sniper, on 18 April 1945, shortly before the end of World War II in Europe. Germany surrendered two weeks later, following the Battle of Berlin.

== History ==
Raymond J. Bowman was an American soldier born in Rochester, New York, who had arrived in Great Britain in January 1944 in preparation for Operation Overlord. After his landing, he served and was wounded in France on 3 August 1944. He also served in Belgium and Germany; he reached the rank of private first class during this time. He was a member of a platoon of machine gunners who entered a building in Leipzig and set positions to cover foot soldiers of the U.S. 2nd Infantry Division who were arriving at the Zeppelin Bridge. Soldiers Bowman and Lehman Riggs of Cookeville, Tennessee, took positions in an open balcony with a clear view of the bridge. One fired the gun, while the other soldier fed it. Riggs came inside, leaving Bowman alone firing the gun. When he was reloading the gun, he was shot in the cheek by a sniper's bullet which came from the street below. He crumpled to the floor, already dead.

War photographer Robert Capa climbed through the balcony window to the flat and he took a picture of the dead soldier, who lay in the open door with the Luftwaffe sheepskin helmet he had looted still on his head. He took other pictures showing how the blood spread on the floor, while other soldiers attended to Bowman and to his fellow gunner.

The photographs were published in Life magazine on 14 May 1945, shortly after Germany surrendered, with the caption The Picture of the Last Man to Die, which became the official title. (Note: The war continued for about two more weeks, so Bowman was not actually the last American soldier to be killed.) They became some of the most iconic images of World War II. Two years later, Capa said in an interview that "It was a very clean, somehow very beautiful death and I think that's what I remember most from the war".

On 17 April 2016, Leipzig renamed a section of the Jahnallee (Jahn Avenue), the street in front of the apartment where Bowman was killed as Bowmanstraße (Bowman Street) and another section as Capastraße (Capa Street). The apartment was saved from demolition and renamed Capa House and now holds a memorial with Robert Capa pictures and information on Private Bowman. Lehman Riggs returned to Leipzig in 2012 and again in 2016 at age 96 to attend the dedication ceremony. Riggs died August 19, 2020, in Cookeville, Tennessee, at the age of 101.

== Public collections ==
There are prints of this photograph at the International Center of Photography, in New York, the Raclin Murphy Museum of Art, and the National Gallery of Victoria, in Melbourne.
