= Wilhelm Busch (disambiguation) =

Wilhelm Busch (1832–1908) was a German caricaturist, painter, and poet.

Wilhelm Busch may also refer to:

- Wilhelm Busch (surgeon) (1826–1881), German physician
- Willy Busch (1907–1982), German footballer
- Wilhelm Busch (pastor) (1897–1966), German Lutheran pastor, youth evangelist, writer and activist
- Wilhelm Busch (historian) (1861–1929), German historian who specialised in English history, in particular the Tudors

== See also ==
- Wilhelm Busch Museum
- Wilhelm Busch Prize
