= St. Nicholas Church Square =

Square in Leipzig, Germany

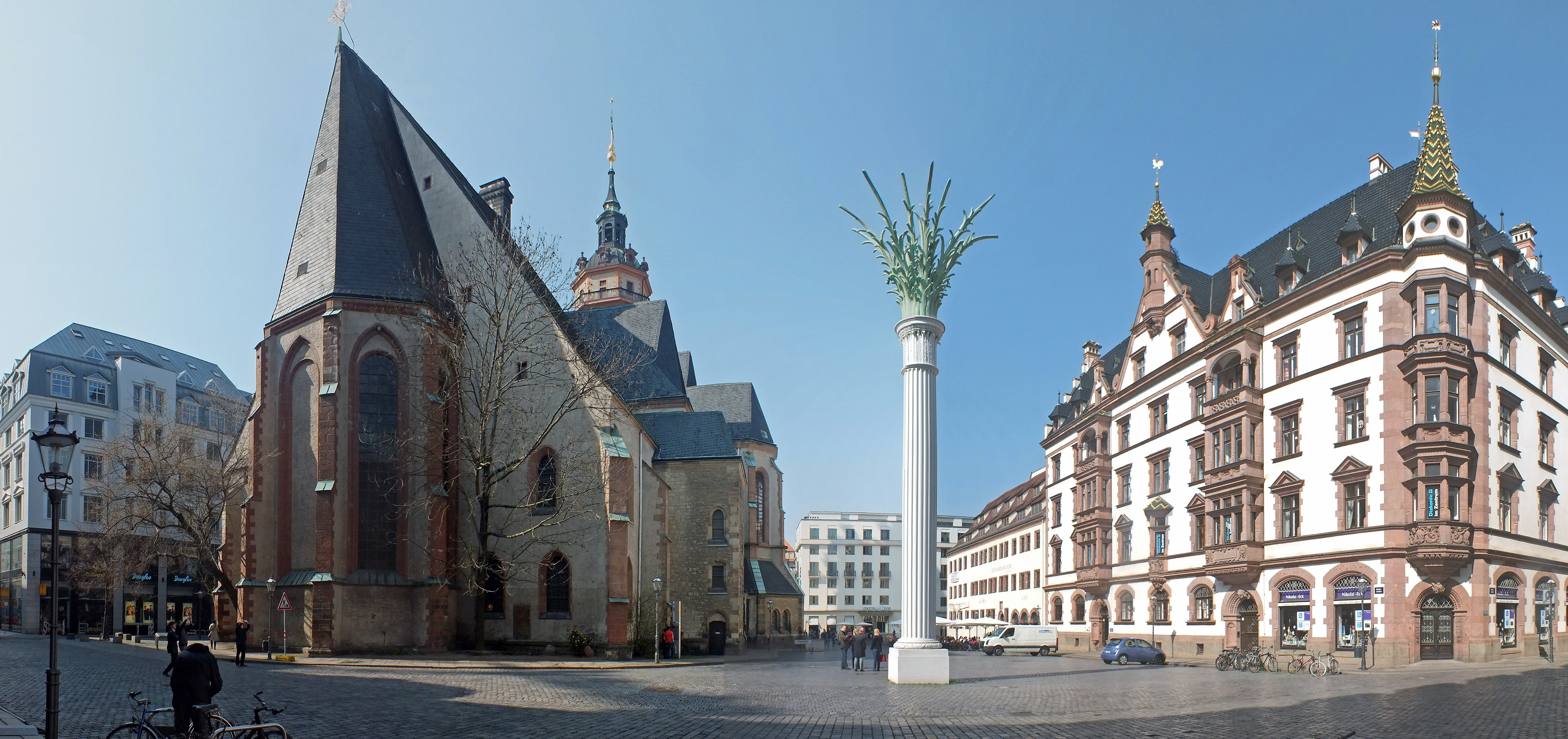
- Panorama of St. Nicholas Church Square from Ritterstrasse
- Native name: Nikolaikirchhof (German)
- Length: 70 m (230 ft)
- Width: 70 m (230 ft)
- Location: Leipzig-Mitte, Leipzig, Germany
- Postal code: 04109
- Coordinates: 51°20′26.09″N 12°22′43″E

The St. Nicholas Church Square (in German: Nikolaikirchhof) is a square in the city center of Leipzig, Germany. The St. Nicholas Church (German: Nikolaikirche) stands on it. The church and square have particular significance for the Peaceful Revolution of 1989.

== Location and development ==
The square is bordered in the east by Ritterstrasse and in the west by Nikolaistrasse. That is why only properties on its north and south sides have the address Nikolaikirchhof. On the north side is the renovated building of the Alte Nikolaischule (in English: Old St. Nicholas School) with the Museum of Antiquities of Leipzig University, a Richard Wagner museum considering his childhood and youth and the Gasthaus Alte Nikolaischule, with outdoor seating in the summer. The second building on the north side is the Predigerhaus (House of the preachers), built in 1886/1887 according to plans by Hugo Licht.

Of the approximately 70 m (229.7 ft) by 70 m (229.7 ft) square, around 40% is taken up by the St. Nicholas Church itself. The church stands on the southern half of the square, so that there is only a square on its north side; to the south there is only about the width of the street. Of the commercial buildings adjacent to the south, only one is part of St. Nicholas Church Square. The rest are continuous properties from Grimmaische Strasse.

The view of the Nikolaikirchhof is limited to the east on Ritterstrasse by the university guest house on the site of the former booksellers' exchange (Buchhändlerbörse) and the Geschwister-Scholl-Haus, and to the west on Nikolaistrasse by Specks Hof and the Motel One.

== History ==
The history of the square next to the church probably goes back to the church construction that began in the twelfth century. The city charter from 1165/1216 referred to the settlement east of Reichsstrasse (Via Imperii). With St. Nicholas Church as the center, it formed another settlement focus in early Leipzig, which was a little further to the southeast than the "Urbs Lipzi". Saint Nicholas was the patron of the merchants who settled here. In terms of the quarterly division of the city area within the city wall, the St. Nicholas quarter (Nikolaiviertel) roughly corresponds to the Grimmaisches Quarter.

As far as the St. Nicholas Church Square is concerned, there is evidence that the school St. Nicholas (Nikolaischule) was built in 1512 after the demolition of a previous house. In 1573 a Renaissance fountain was created at the west end of the square, which was replaced by a new fountain in 1657. This is no longer present in pictures from the 19th century.

By the end of the 19th century, the north side of the square had been built up with a front of three-story houses for at least 200 years. A residential and commercial building on the western corner was followed by the Nikolaischule, which was only combined with the corner house during the last renovation, which can still be seen in the window structure. Then followed the priest's house, which were replaced by the Predigerhaus.

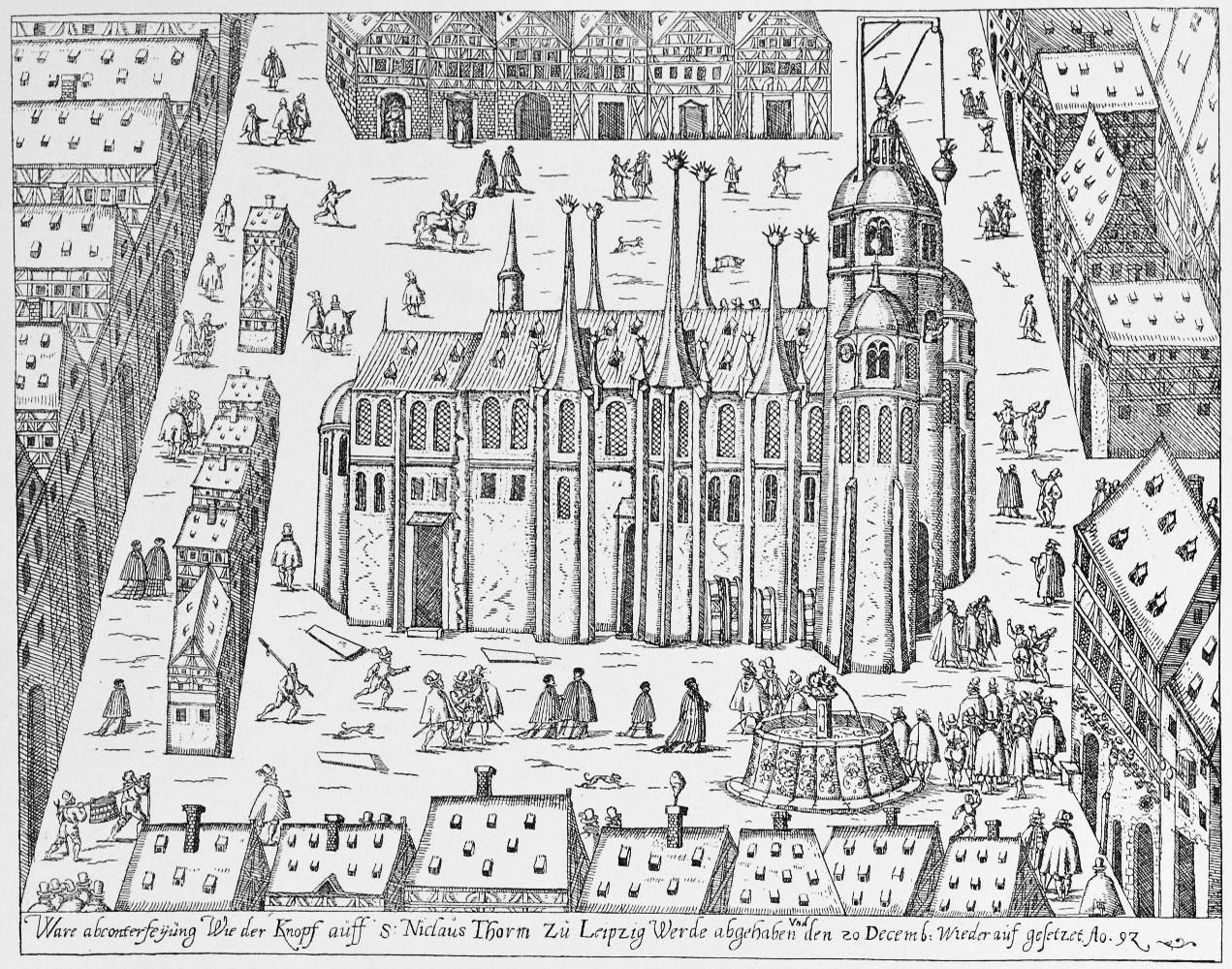
1592

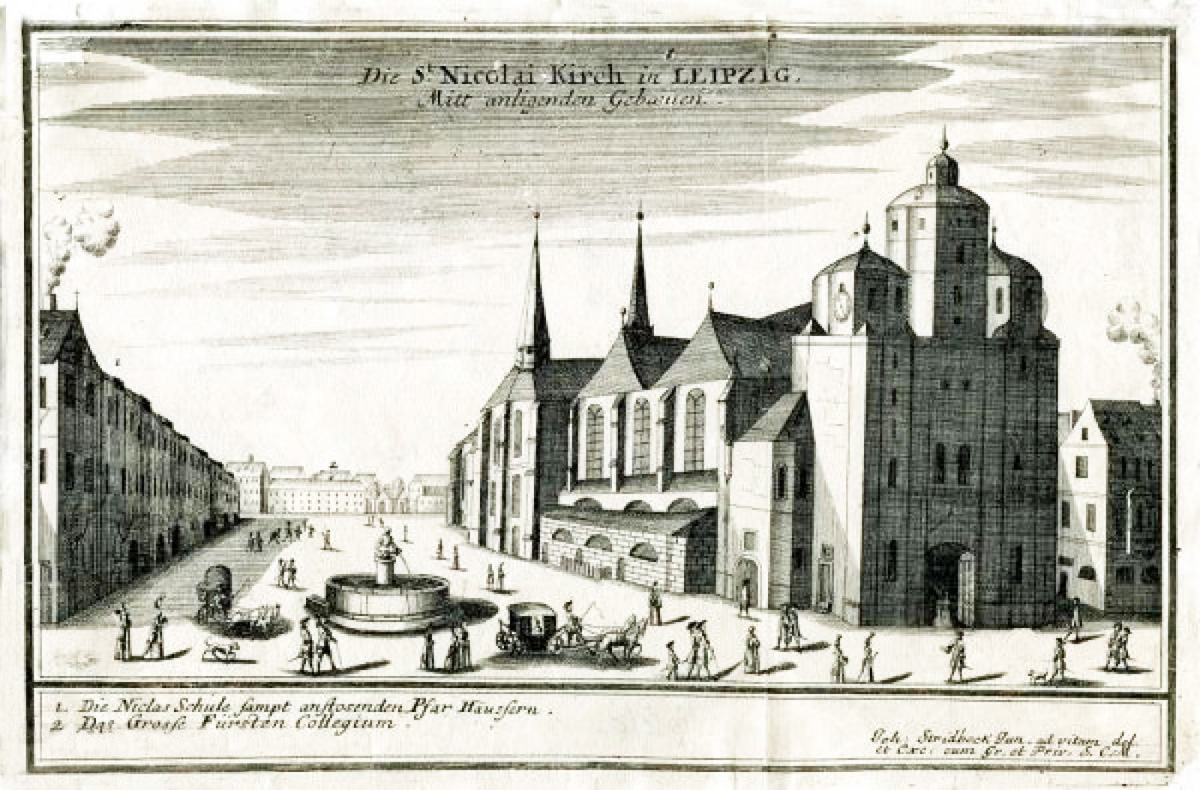
1695

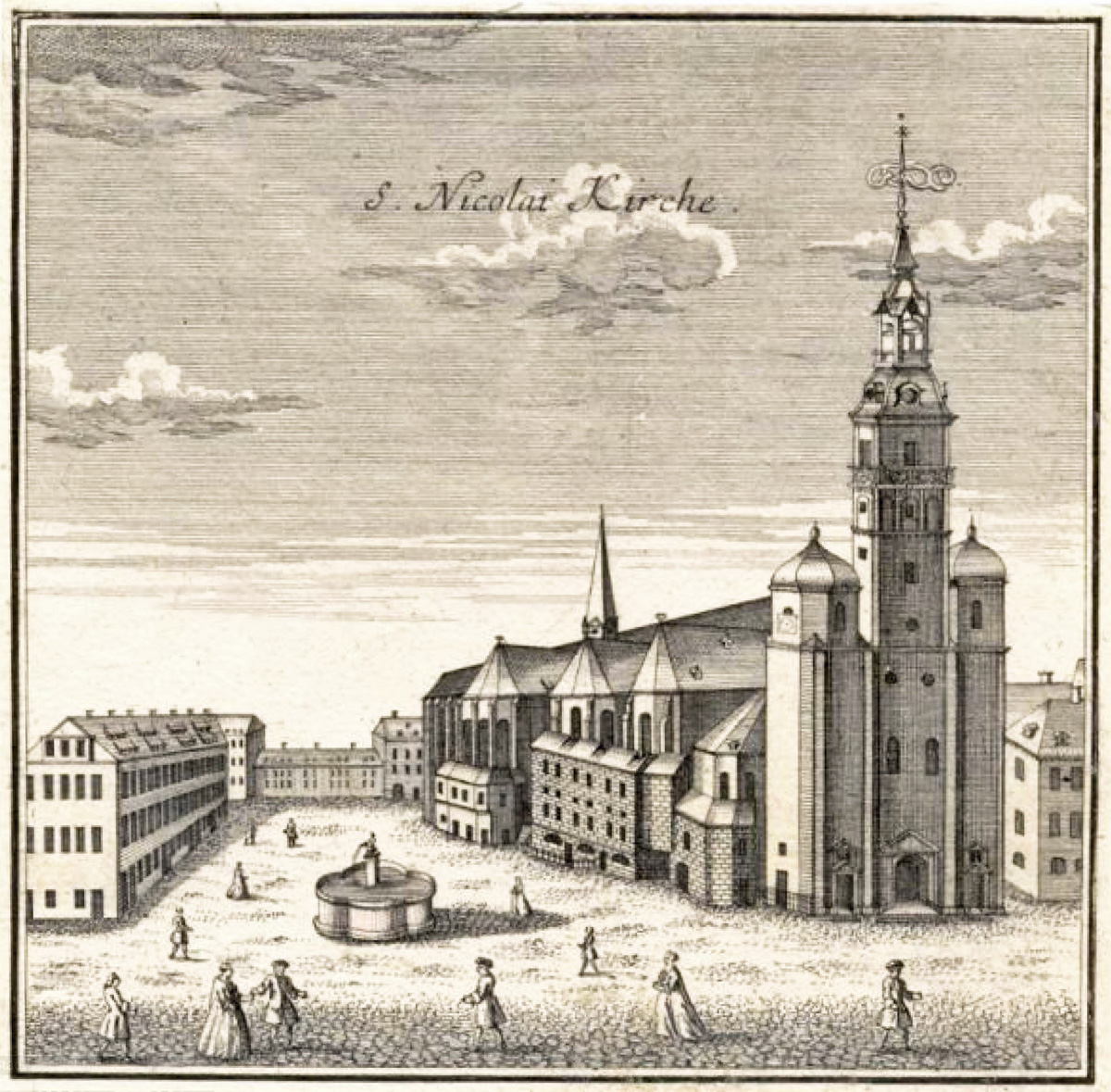
1749

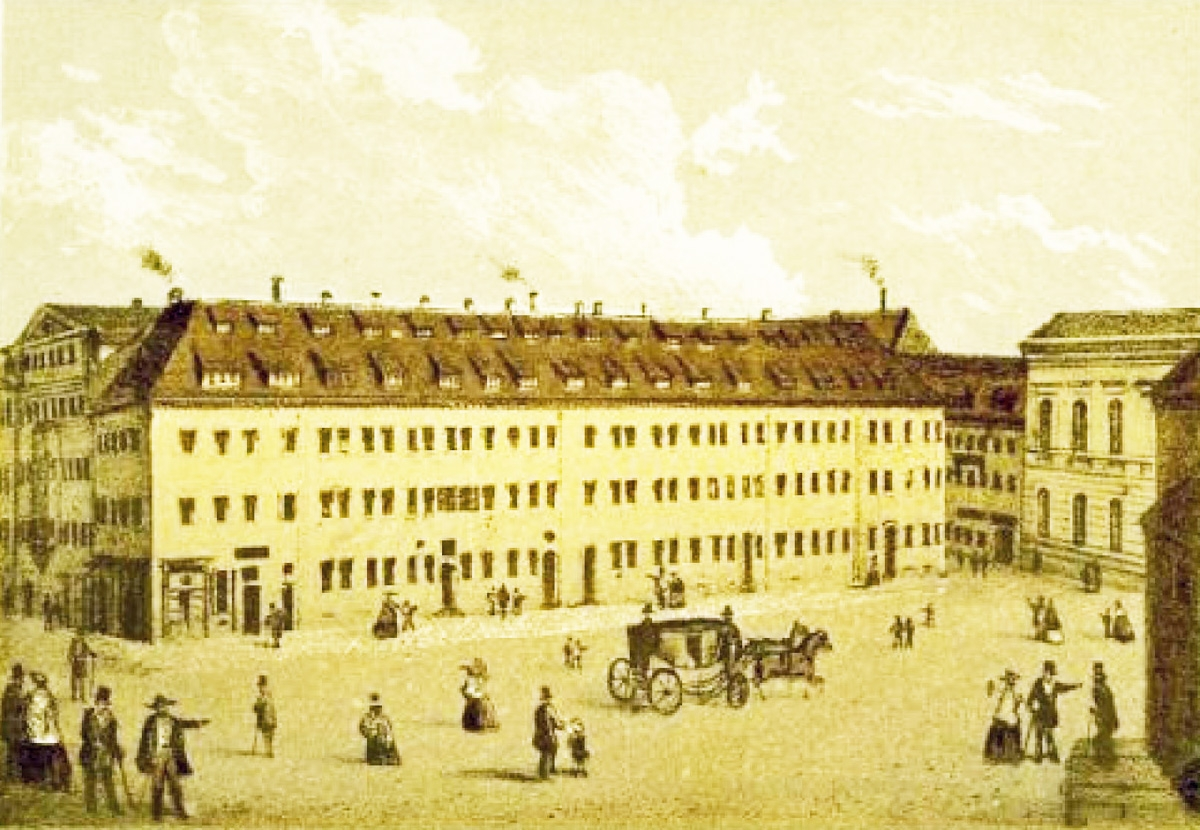
1860

The St. Nicholas Church Square acquired particular importance in connection with the events of the Peaceful Revolution of 1989 in Leipzig. In September 1989, the clashes between demonstrators and the state came to a head following the Monday peace prayer in the St. Nicholas Church in the Church Square, as the Monday demonstration was supposed to be nipped in the bud. Most of the arrests took place in the St. Nicholas Church Square until the decisive demonstration took place on 9 October 1989.

== Memorial monuments to the Peaceful Revolution ==
In view of its importance for the peaceful revolution of 1989, several memorial monuments were erected in the St. Nicholas Church Square.

A 16 m (52.5 ft) tall column was erected on the east side of the square in 1999. It is a replica of the columns within the church and symbolizes how the ideas of departure were carried from the church into the public space. The palm fronds at the top of the column represent the peacefulness of the goals. The column is part of the design with which the Leipzig artist Andreas Stötzner won an international competition to design the square organized by the Leipzig Cultural Foundation Kulturstiftung Leipzig and the city in 1992. The column was made by the Leipzig sculptor Markus Brille. Two-thirds of the funding comes from donations from citizens, companies and institutions.

The column includes a memorial plaque embedded in the pavement of the square, also made by Brille, with the inscription “09 OCTOBER 1989” and numerous shoe prints depicting the demonstration.

A fountain and a light installation followed in 2003 with the support of the Foundation Stiftung Lebendige Stadt. The fountain was designed by the Berlin branch of David Chipperfield Architects. A bowl made of granite from Lausitz with a diameter of 3.3 m (10.8 ft) filled to the brim with water symbolizes the political situation in the GDR in 1989, in which “every drop could be the last straw”.

For the light installation “Public Light” by the artists Tilo Schulz and Kim Worterlkamp, 144 lighting elements are embedded in the pavement of the square, which are switched on randomly in the colors blue, green and magenta within three hours after dark. These points of light represent coming together for a peaceful assembly.

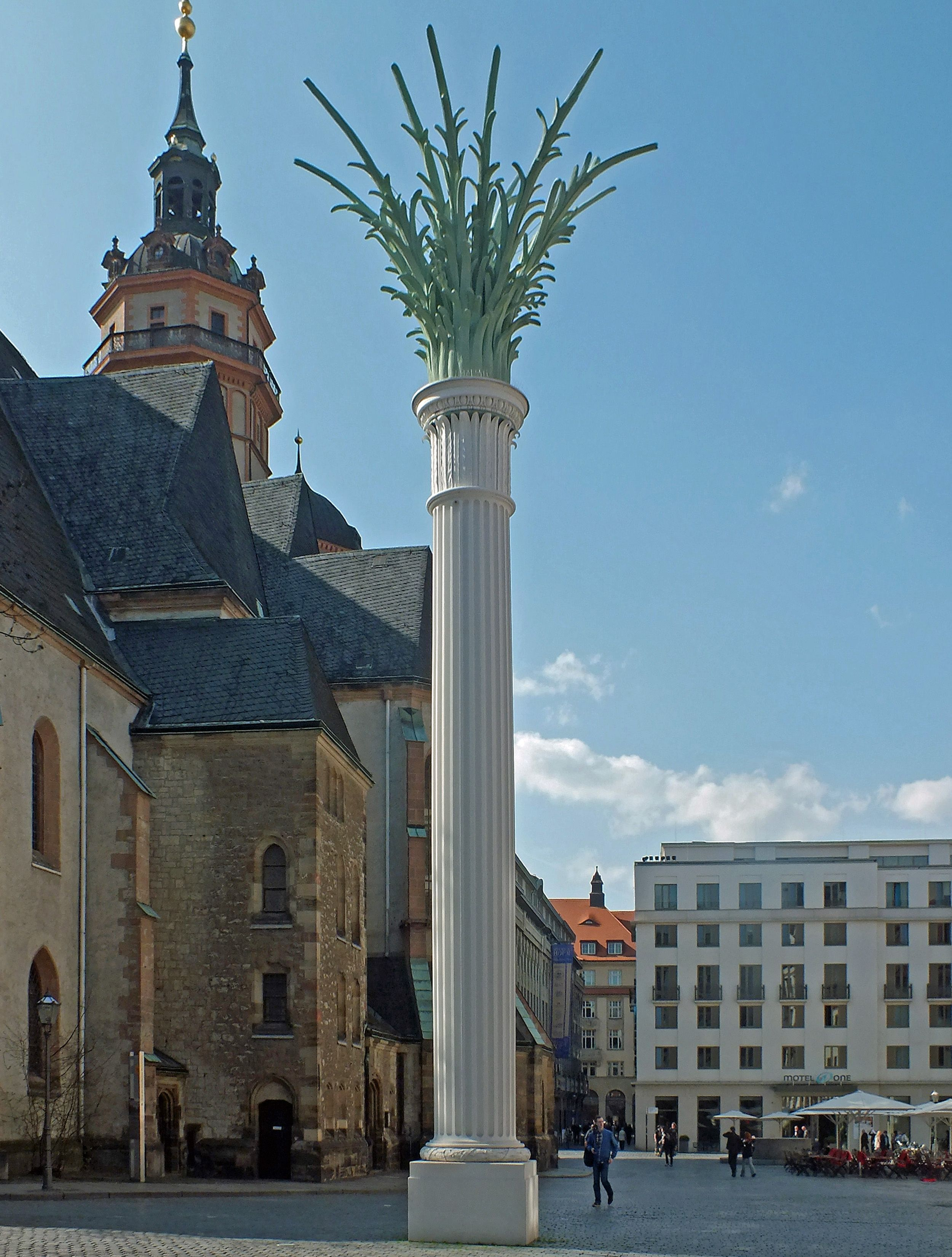
The column St. Nicholas

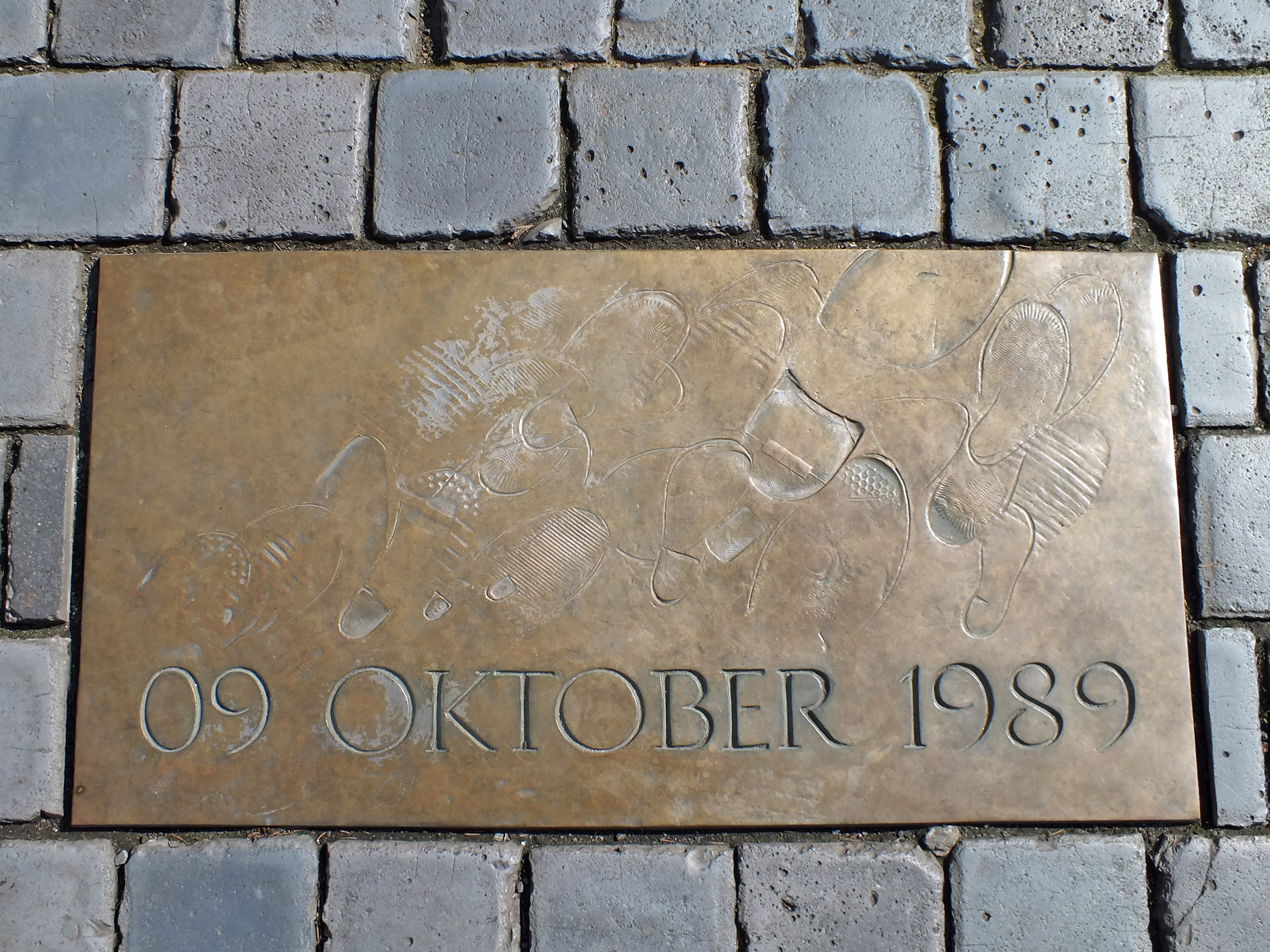
Board „09 OKTOBER 1989“

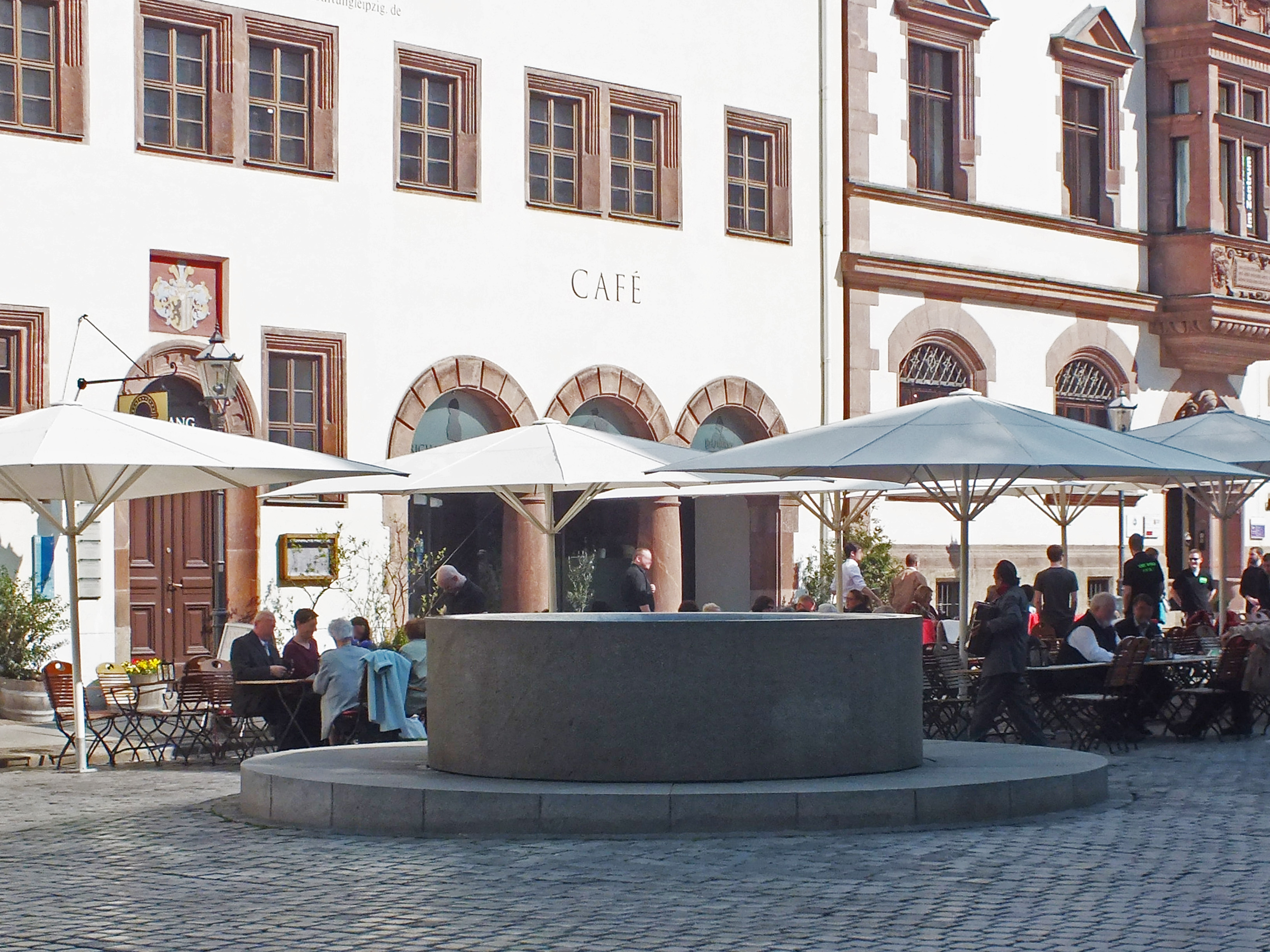
The fountain St. Nicholas

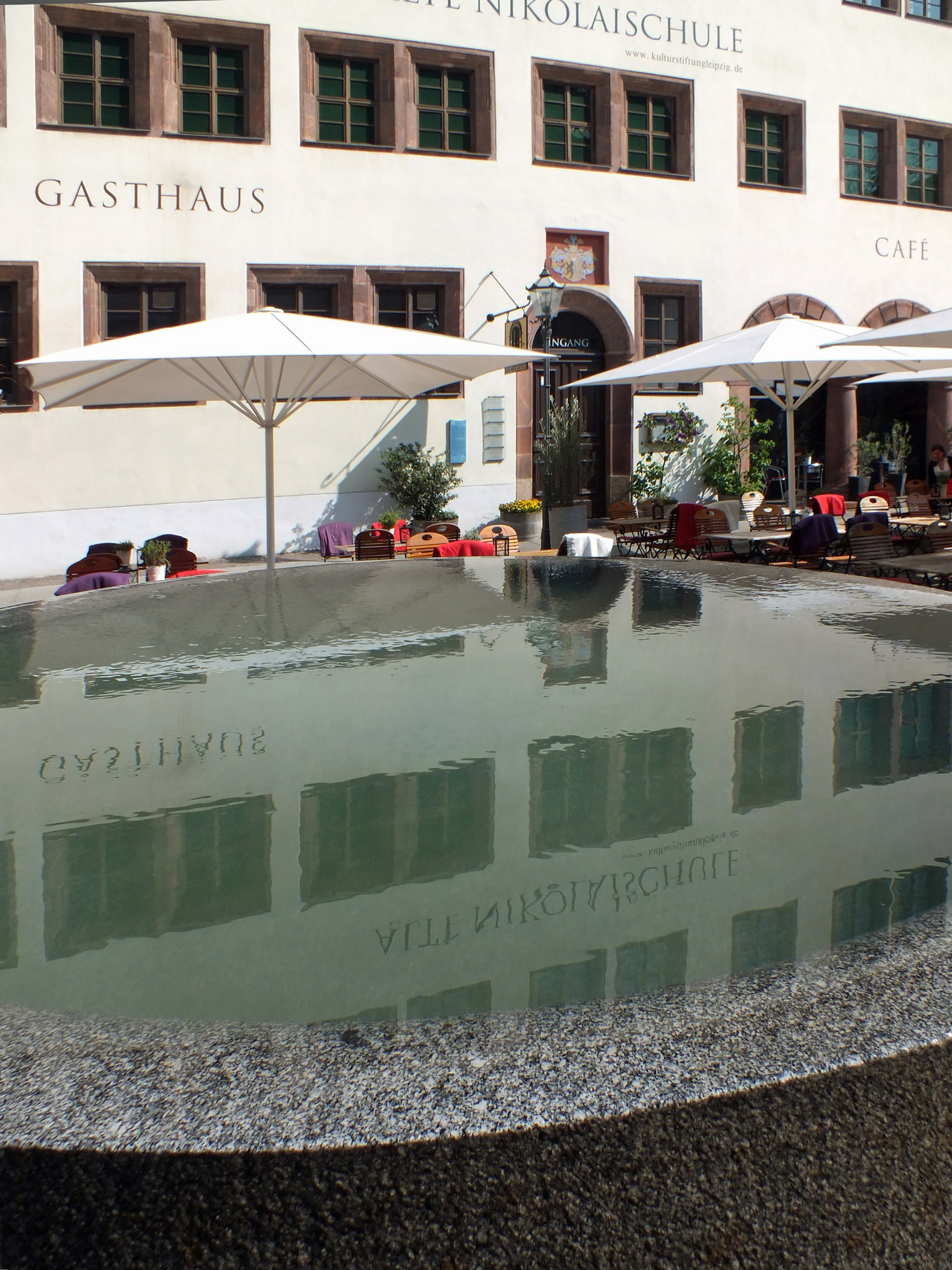
The fountain filled with water

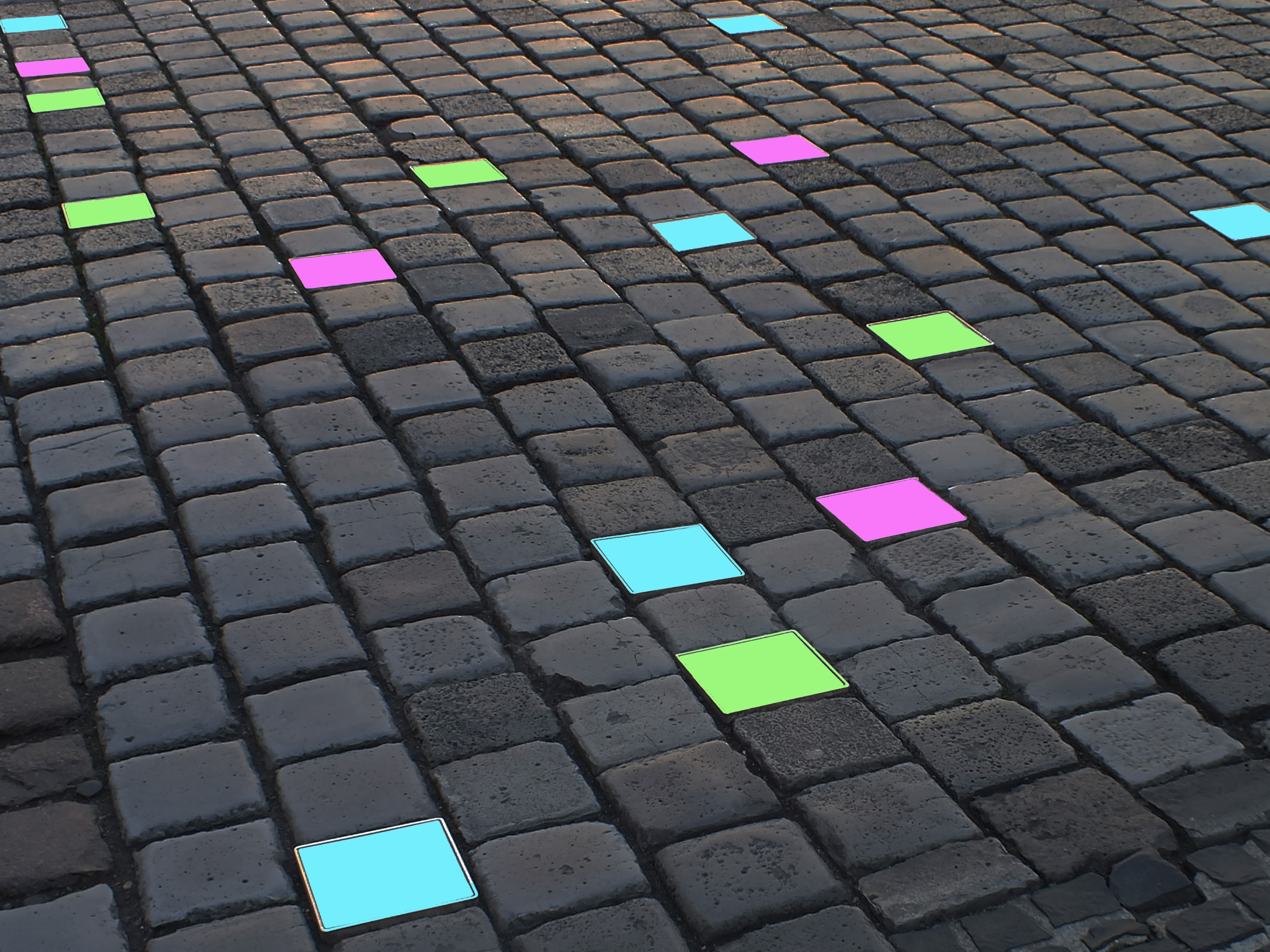
The light installation

== Literature ==
- Hocquél, Wolfgang (2023). Architekturführer Leipzig. Von der Romanik bis zu Gegenwart (in German). Leipzig: Passage Verlag. pp. 108–113. ISBN 978-3-95415-128-8.

== See also ==
- Architecture of Leipzig - Romanesque and Gothic
- Nikolaikirche (1995 film)
