= Old St Nicholas School, Leipzig =

School in Leipzig, Germany

Old St. Nicholas School
- Alte Nikolaischule
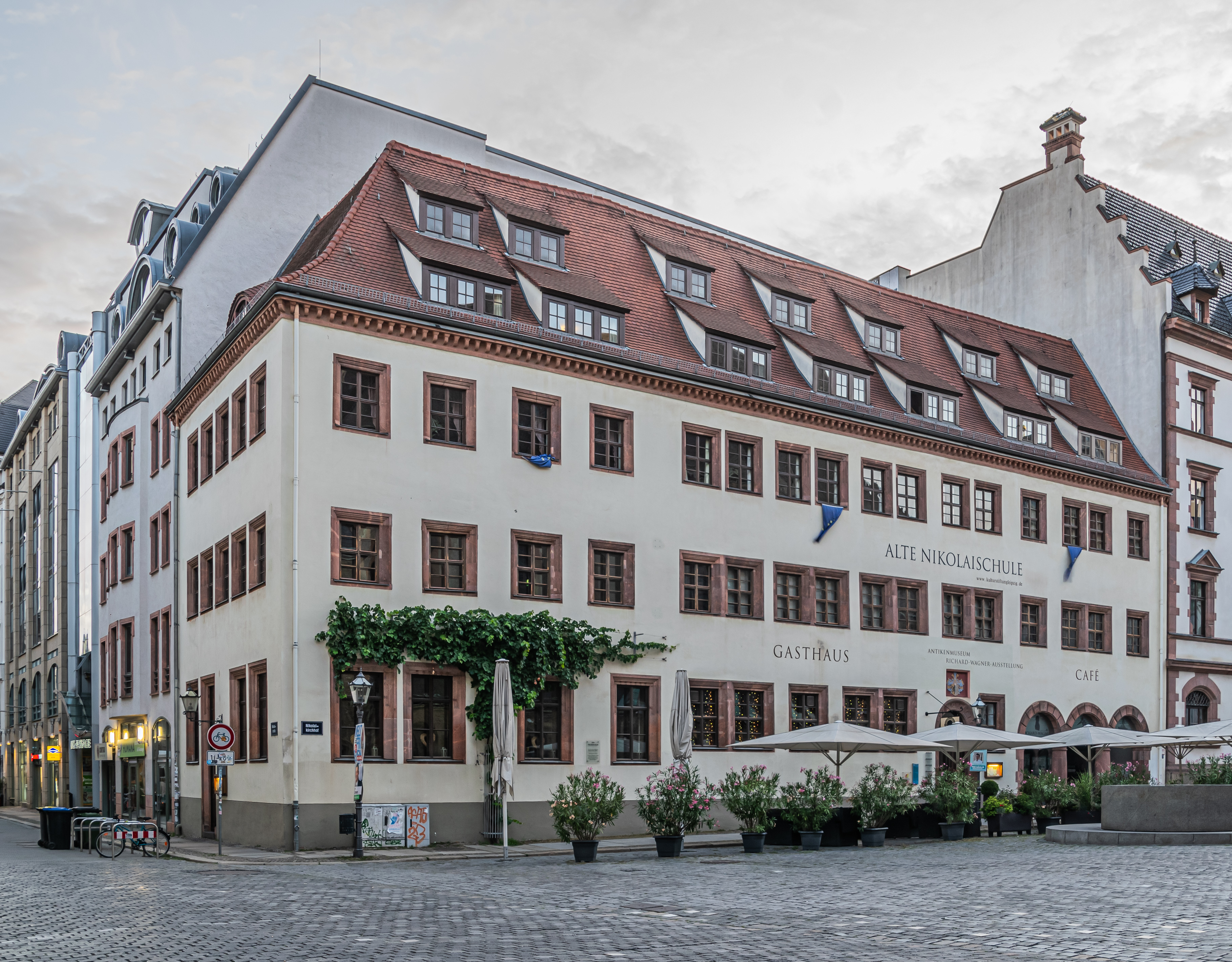
- Interactive map of Old St. Nicholas School

General information
- Architectural style: Renaissance
- Location: Nikolaikirchhof 2, 04109 Leipzig, Leipzig, Germany
- Coordinates: 51°20′26.89″N 12°22′43.05″E

The Old St. Nicholas School was the first non-church secondary school in Leipzig, Germany. The native German name is Alte Nikolaischule, the Latin name was Schola Nikolaitana. Old St. Nicholas School is also the name of a building on the St. Nicholas Church Square in the Borough of Leipzig-Mitte. It is a listed building and includes part of the building dating from 1553 and a corner house built in 1730 on the corner of Nikolaistrasse. The building was renovated and expanded from 1990 to 1994 in accordance with its status as a listed building. After that, it became the home of the Museum of Antiquities of Leipzig University, a museum about the youth of Richard Wagner, the Kulturstiftung Leipzig (Leipzig Cultural Foundation) and a restaurant with an outdoor seating area.

== History ==
The history of the Old St. Nicholas School dates back to the end of the 14th century. On 11 March 1395, the city councilors of Leipzig were authorized by decree of Pope Boniface IX to establish a city school at St. Nicholas Church or in the surrounding area. Initially, however, there continued to be only a private school, the Schola Nikolaitana, first mentioned in 1490. The name became a nickname and later the official name for the students who studied there: the "Nikolaitaner".

Because of the prior-ranking founding of the University of Leipzig in 1409, the council did not decide to establish the school until 14 March 1498. On 26 September 1510, the council renewed its decision to build a school, so that in 1511 the dilapidated house at Nikolaikirchhof 2 could be purchased and demolished along with the adjacent sacristy. On 6 December 1512 (St. Nicholas Day), Leipzig's first secular school was inaugurated. When Protestant teaching was introduced in Leipzig in 1539, the Nikolaischule was reformed.

In 1551, the schoolhouse burned down, and in 1568, a new building was constructed, which was remodeled in the Renaissance style in 1596/97. By 1611, the Nikolaischule had become a six-class Latin school; German-language instruction was not introduced into the school's regulations until 1716. During this period, Gottfried Wilhelm Leibniz, considered the last universal genius, was a Nicolaitan from 1655 to 1661.

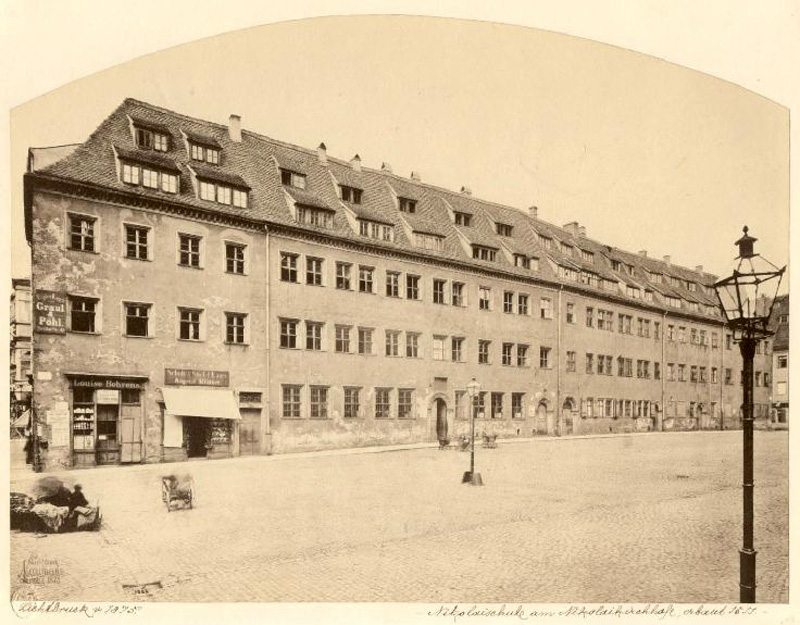
The building complex in 1875: From left: Commercial building (ground floor only), St. Nicholas School, Priests' Houses

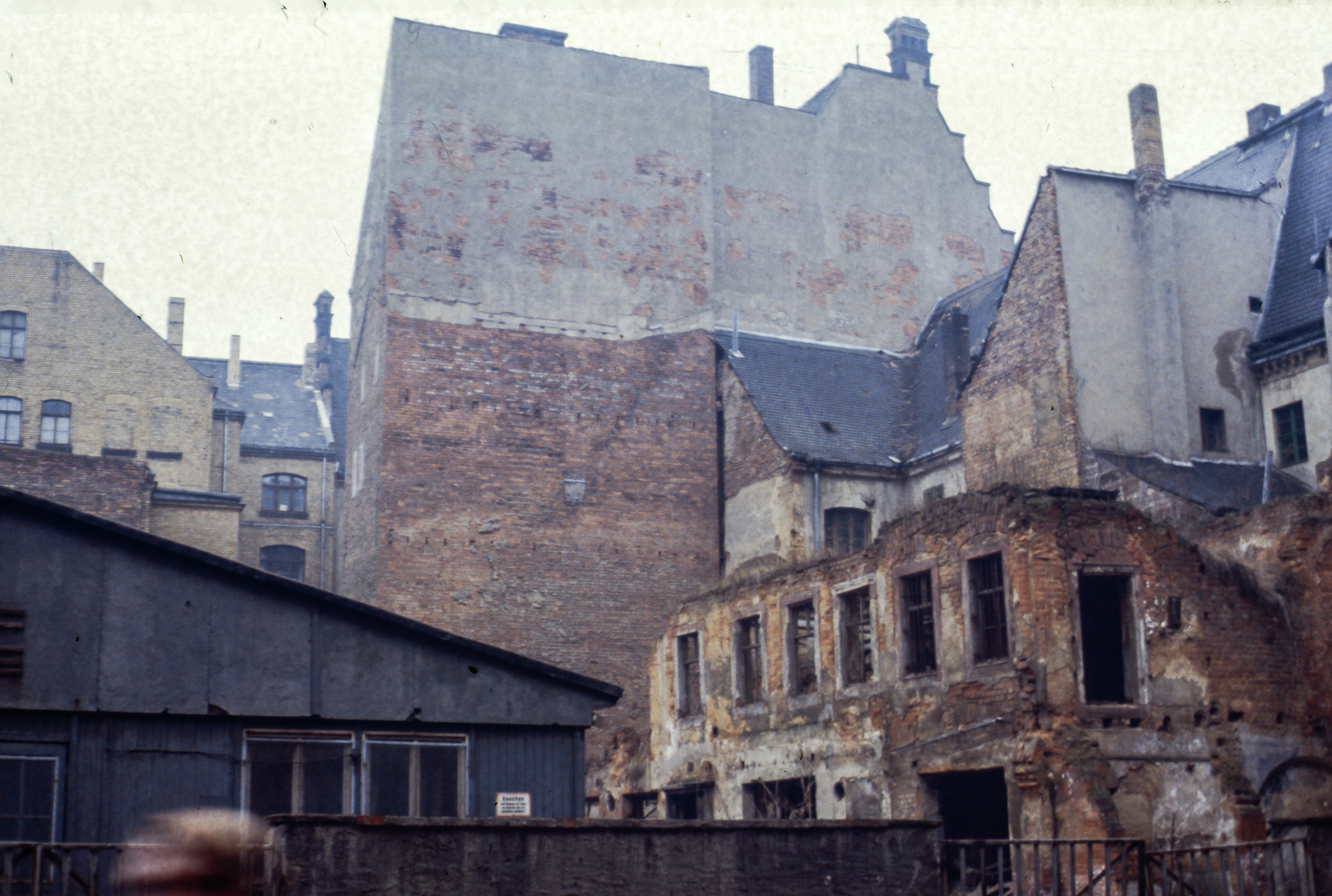
State of the backyard in 1980

A lecture hall, as well as the previously completely missing Karzer (prison cell), were only available after the annexation of the upper floors of the neighboring corner building between 1824 and 1827. The future composer Richard Wagner received music lessons in the school's "Redesaal" (auditorium), built in the late neoclassical illusionistic style on the second floor of this building. This, arguably the most beautiful room in the building, was authentically reconstructed in 1994 and today seats 100 people for events.

on 15 April 1872, the school moved to the new Nikolaischule building designed by August Friedrich Viehweger at Königstrasse 30 (today Goldschmidtstrasse). After that, the building housed a variety of institutions. For example, from 1886 to 1889 it housed the interim Königliche Baugewerbeschule, from 1897 the 1st Medical Station of the Samaritan Society, from 1907 to 1910 the main guardhouse of the garrison, storage facilities, business premises and rooms for the Leipzig Trade Fair, a police station, and from 1890 to 1896 the office of the Allgemeine Ortskrankenkasse (Joint Local Health Insurance Fund for Leipzig and the Surrounding Area). During the GDR era, the building became the legal entity of the university in 1953. After being used by the Business School in the 1970s, it fell into increasing disrepair, so that the building inspectorate was forced to close it in 1976.

== Since 1990 ==
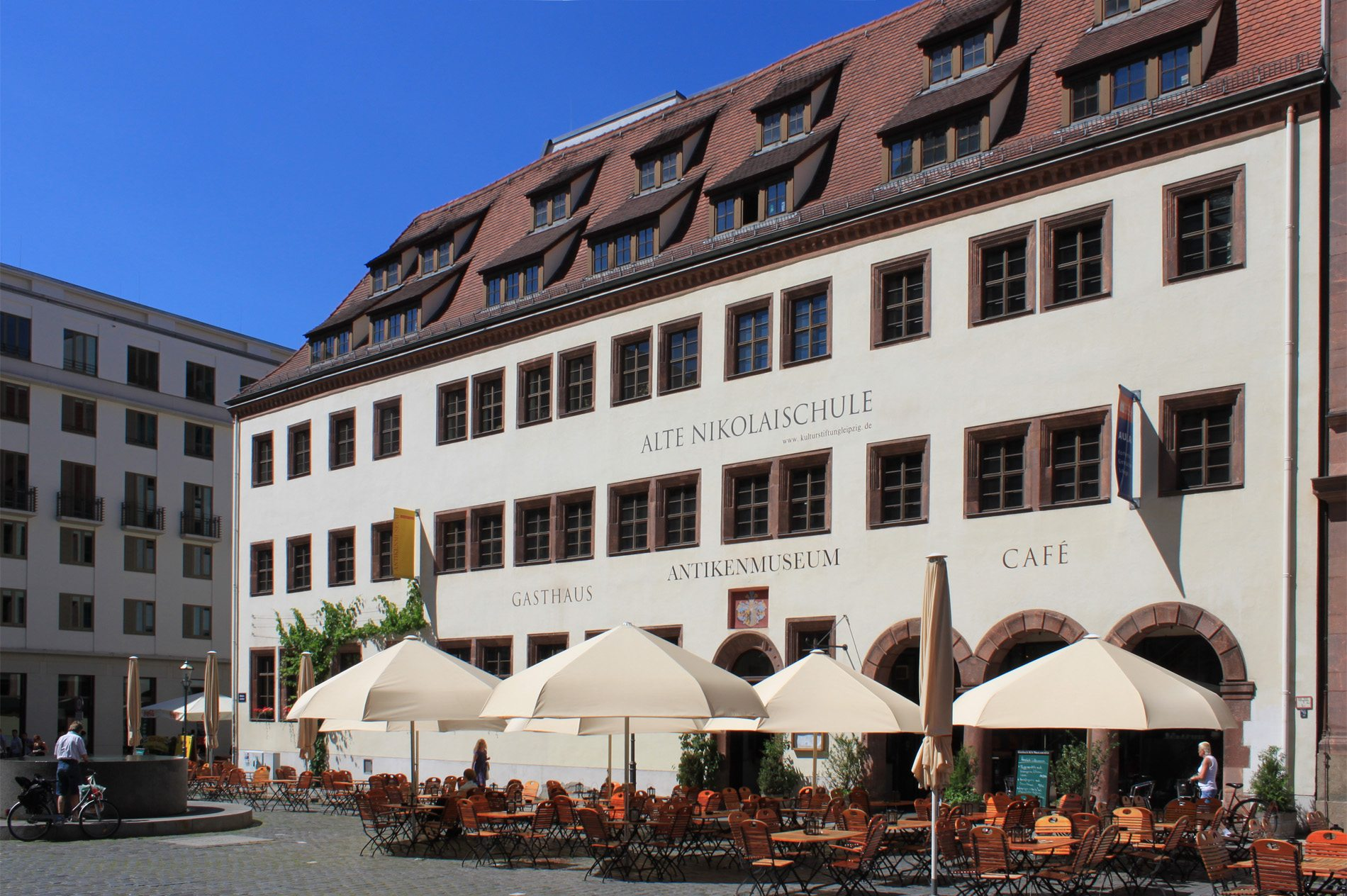
Summer at the Old St. Nicholas School, Leipzig

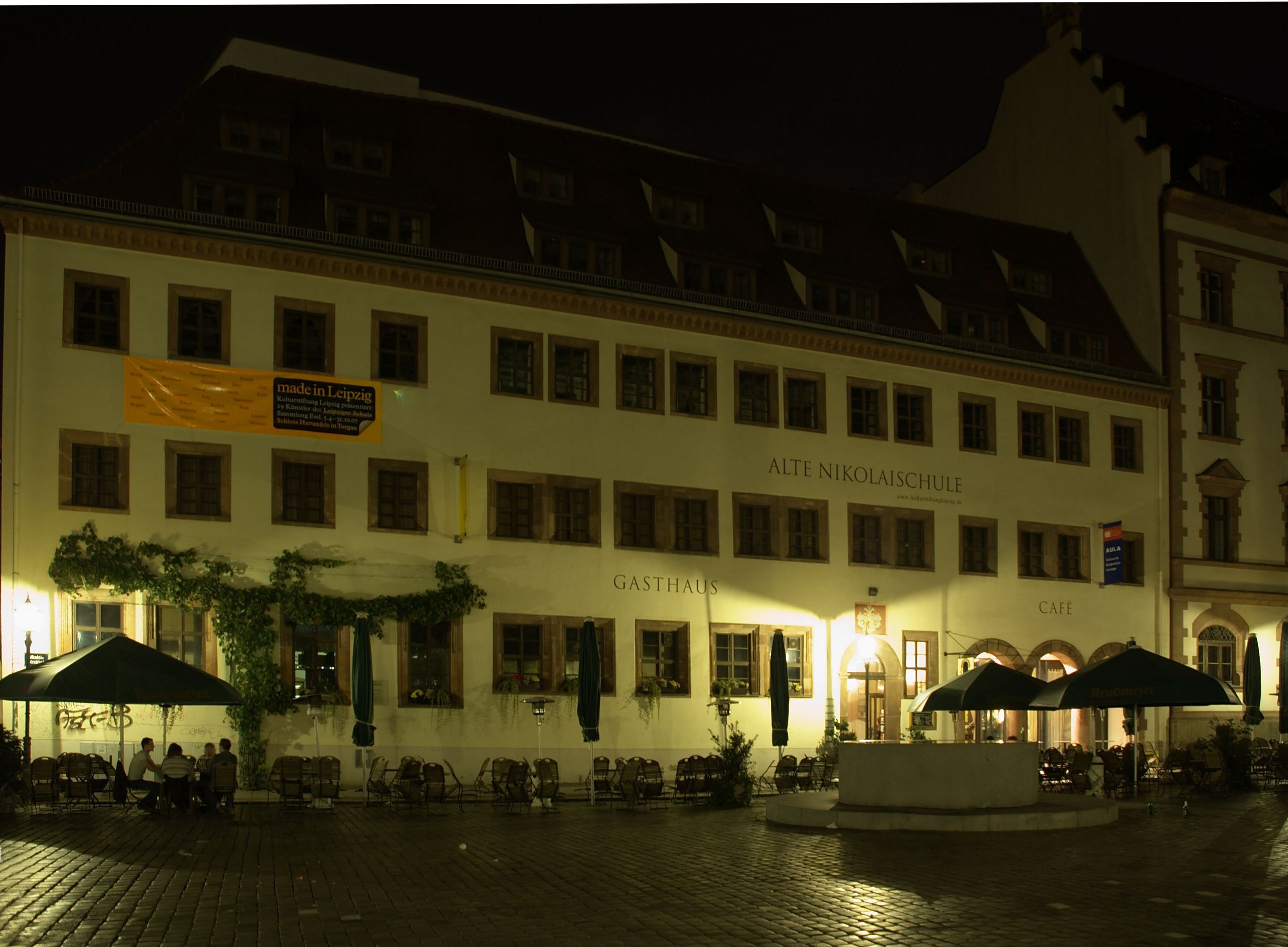
Old St. Nicholas School at night

The Kulturstiftung Leipzig immediately campaigned for the preservation of the Old St. Nicholas School after its founding in 1990. As early as October 1990, the then city council passed a resolution to transfer the building to the Kulturstiftung (Cultural Foundation). Thanks to a 10 million DM donation from the City of Frankfurt am Main and Saxon funding for monument preservation, the foundation began to carefully renovate the listed building between 1991 and 1994, transforming it into a cultural and heritage-compatible use. The Old St. Nicholas School Building reopened on 10 September 1994. The renovation was awarded the first architectural prize by the Saxon Chamber of Architects in the category "Conversion and Extension of Historic Buildings."

This created a new cultural and historical excursion destination in Leipzig's city center and, with the "Gasthaus Alte Nikolaischule" in the historic schoolroom - the auditorium - a well-known restaurant in the city. The Alte Nikolaischule is also home to the Leipzig Cultural Foundation and, since 1994, the Museum of Antiquities of Leipzig University. In 1996, the Leipzig University of Applied Sciences founded its Automatic Machine Museum here with close links to G. W. Leibniz and based on a collection from the Leipzig University of Technology. The Automatic Machine Museum has since moved to Leipzig-Plagwitz, into the "GaraGe" building at Karl-Heine-Strasse 97. The former school rooms now house a Richard Wagner Museum, which opened in 2013 to mark the 200th anniversary of his birth and is dedicated to the childhood and youth of this Leipzig-born composer.

Alte Nikolaischule / Old St Nicholas School is station N. 11 on the Leipzig Musik Trail.

The school as an institution is located in Leipzig-Stötteritz at Schönbachstrasse 17 since 1995 as the Neue Nikolaischule Leipzig.

== Rectors ==
- 1670–1676 Jakob Thomasius
- 1758–1774 Johann Jakob Reiske
- 1866–1877 Justus Hermann Lipsius

== Famous Nicolaitans ==
- Gottfried Wilhelm Leibniz (1655–1661), philosopher, mathematician, jurist, historian and political advisor of the early Enlightenment
- Christian Thomasius (1665–1670), lawyer and philosopher
- Johann Gottfried Seume (1776–1777), writer and poet
- Georg Benedikt Winer (1801–1809), Protestant theologian
- Franz Hermann Schulze-Delitzsch (1821–1827), politician and economist
- Richard Wagner (1828–1830), composer, writer, theater director and conductor
- Max Müller (1835–), orientalist, philologist
- Theodor Möbius ( -1840), philologist
- Reinhold Schraps ( -1852), lawyer, politician
- Conrad Cichorius, ancient historian and classical philologist
- Wilhelm Busch (historian)
- Felix Hausdorff (1878–1887), mathematician, persecuted by the Nazi regime
- Karl Liebknecht (1882–1890; already in the new school building), socialist
