= Emil Ludwig Schmidt =

German ethnologist and anthropologist (1837–1906)

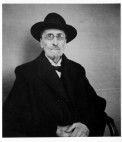
Emil L. Schmidt

Emil Ludwig Schmidt (7 April 1837 – 22 October 1906) was a German anthropologist and ethnologist. He was son-in-law to art historian Johannes Adolph Overbeck (1826–1895).

Schmidt was born in Upper Eichstätt. Originally trained as a doctor, he studied medicine at the Universities of Jena, Leipzig and Bonn. From 1862 to 1865 he served as a surgical assistant to Wilhelm Busch at Bonn, afterwards working as a physician in Essen (He served as head of the Krupp Hospital and as family physician to the Krupp family).

In 1869–70 and 1876 he took anthropological study trips to North America, and in 1875 performed research in Egypt. In 1885 he received habilitation at the University of Leipzig, where in 1889 he became an associate professor of anthropology and ethnography. In 1889–90 he performed research in Ceylon and southern India.

In 1900 Schmidt donated his collection of more than 1000 human skulls to the University of Leipzig.

== Selected publications ==
- Anthropologische Methoden (Anthropological methods), Leipzig 1888.
- Die Vorgeschichte Nordamerikas im Gebiete der Vereinigten Staaten (Prehistory of North America in areas of the United States), Braunschweig 1894.
- Reise in Süd- Indien (Travel in southern India), Leipzig 1894.
- Ceylon, (Ceylon), Berlin 1897.
