= Johannes Overbeck =

German archaeologist and art historian (1826–1895)

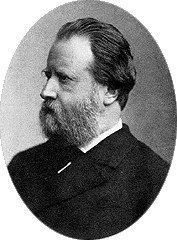

Johannes Adolph Overbeck (27 March 1826 – 8 November 1895) was a German archaeologist and art historian.

== Biography ==
Overbeck was born in Antwerp. He was son-in-law to zoologist Georg August Goldfuss (1782-1848), and was father-in-law to anthropologist Emil Ludwig Schmidt (1837-1906). His uncle was famed painter Friedrich Overbeck (1789-1869).

In 1848 Overbeck received his Ph.D. from the University of Bonn, where he served as a privatdocent from 1850 to 1853. In 1853, he became an associate professor of archaeology and dean of the archaeological collection at the University of Leipzig. He worked at Leipzig for the remainder of his career, becoming a full professor in 1859. Two of his better known students were Adolf Furtwängler (1853-1907) and Adolf Michaelis (1835-1910). He also helped direct the Archaeological Institute in Berlin (1874-1895).

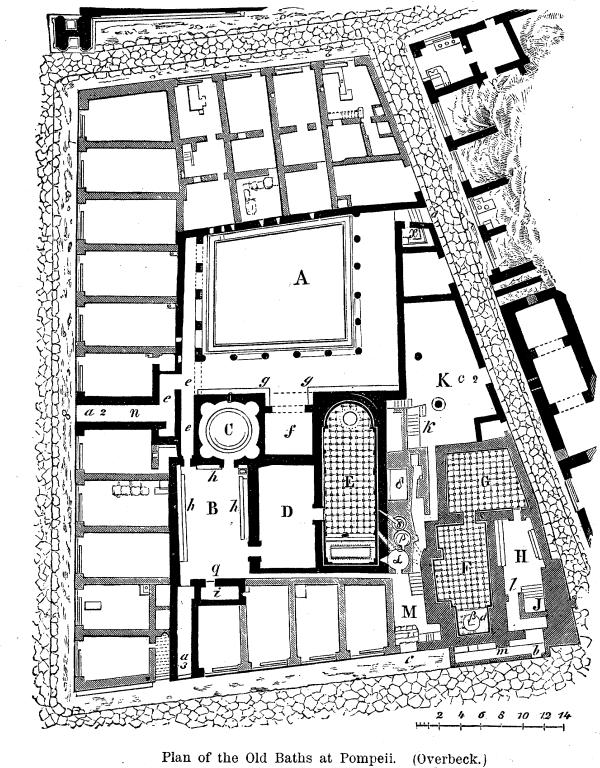
Plan of the Old Baths at Pompeii by Overbeck

One of his earliest publications was a significant work on Pompeii that ran to several editions, and in 1884 with August Mau (1840-1909), he published a book about Pompeii and its works of art, titled Pompeji in seinen Gebäuden, Alterthümern und Kunstwerken. Overbeck was also a specialist of Greek Kunstmythologie (mythological art) within the field of archaeology.

He rarely visited archaeological sites, preferring to write about them second hand. This tended to give his writings a dry flavor, which even his comprehensive marshalling and organization of materials could not really overcome. Carl Schurz has noted that "it has been said that [Overbeck] wrote the best book that has ever been written on Herculaneum and Pompeii, without ever having seen either spot." Overbeck's devotion was mainly to the lecture pulpit, and there he made his most noteworthy contributions. His lectures were very well attended, the primary ones with frequently over 100 listeners. He sought to improve the life of students in other ways as well, by establishing a reading room and infirmary. As one compensation for his lack of first-hand experience, he developed Leipzig's collection of plaster casts.

== Selected writings ==
- Pompeii, Leipzig 1855
- Geschichte der Griechischen Plastik (History of Greek sculpture), two volumes, Leipzig 1857/58
- Die archäologische Sammlung der Universität Leipzig (The archaeological collection of the University of Leipzig), Leipzig 1859
- Die antiken Schriftquellen zur Geschichte der bildenden Künste bei den Griechen (The ancient manuscript sources on the history of Greek fine arts), Leipzig 1868
- Griechische Kunstmythologie (Greek art-mythology), three volumes, Leipzig 1871/89
- Atlas, Leipzig 1872/87
- Pompeji in seinen Gebäuden, Alterthümern und Kunstwerken (Inside Pompeii's buildings, antiquities and works of art), with August Mau (1884).
