= Wilhelm Maurenbrecher =

German historian (1838–1892)

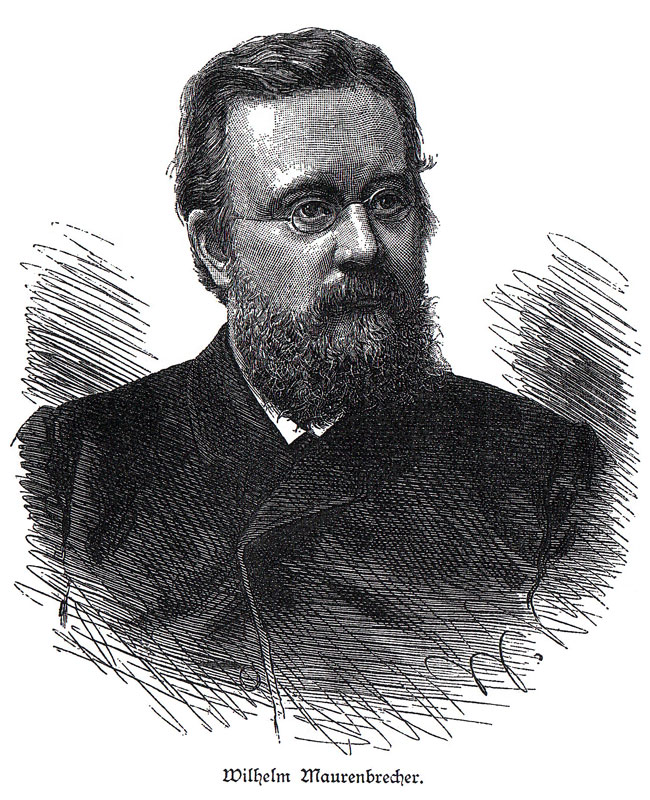
Wilhelm Maurenbrecher

Karl Peter Wilhelm Maurenbrecher (21 December 1838 – 6 November 1892) was a German historian.

He was born in Bonn and studied in Berlin and Munich under Leopold von Ranke and Heinrich von Sybel, being especially influenced by the latter historian. After conducting research work at Simancas in Spain, he successively became an associate and full professor of history at the Imperial University of Dorpat (1867).

Afterwards, he attained professorships in history at Königsberg (1869), Bonn (1877) and Leipzig (1884), where he was successor to his late friend Carl von Noorden.

As a Protestant historian, Maurenbrecher felt an obligation to treat Catholic history objectively. He shared Ranke's views in regards to the common origin of the Protestant and Catholic Reformations. He chose the term "Catholic Reformation" as an indication of it being a positive tendency of reform rather than a defensive reaction to the Protestant Reformation. Maurenbrecher depicted the Dutch scholar Erasmus as a pioneer and proponent of Catholic reform.

== Literary works ==
Many of Maurenbrecher's works are concerned with the Reformation, among them being:

- England im Reformationszeitalter (Düsseldorf, 1866) - England and the Age of Reformation.
- Karl V. und die deutschen Protestanten (Düsseldorf, 1865) - Charles V and the German Protestants.
- Studien und Skizzen zur Geschichte der Reformationszeit (Leipzig, 1874) - Studies and sketches on the history of the Reformation.
- Geschichte der Katholischen Reformation (Nördlingen, 1880, incomplete) - History of the Catholic Reformation.

Other writings by Maurenbrecher include:

- Gründung des deutschen Reiches 1859-1871 (Leipzig, 1892; 1902) - Founding of the German Empire 1859–1871.
- Geschichte der deutschen Königswahlen (Leipzig, 1889) - History of the German royal elections.

== Bibliography ==
- Wilhelm Busch: Zur Erinnerung an Wilhelm Maurenbrecher. Neue Bonner Zeitung, Bonn 1893.
- Gustav Wolf: Wilhelm Maurenbrecher. Ein Lebens- und Schaffensbild. Berlin 1893.
- Hubert Jedin: Katholische Reformation oder Gegenreformation Luzern 1946.
- Walther Hubatsch: Wilhelm Maurenbrecher. In: Bonner Gelehrte. Geschichtswissenschaften. Bonn 1968, S. 155–161.
- Gangolf Hübinger: Maurenbrecher. In: Neue Deutsche Biographie Bd.16. Berlin 1990, S. 433 f.
- John C. G. Röhl: Wilhelm II. Die Jugend des Kaisers 1859–1888. München 1993, S. 312–319.
- Mario Todte: Wilhelm Maurenbrecher und die Lutherische Reformation. Leipzig 2001.
- Mario Todte: Wilhelm Maurenbrecher als Reformationshistoriker. Leipzig 2002.
- Mario Todte: Wilhelm Maurenbrecher - Neue Forschungsergebnisse und Einsichten, München-Ravensbrück 2006.
