= Joseph Doutrelepont =

Louis Guillaume Joseph Doutrelepont (3 June 1834, Malmedy – 30 April 1918, Bonn) was a German surgeon and dermatologist.

In 1858 he received his medical doctorate in Berlin, then furthered his education at the University of Bonn as a student of surgeon Wilhelm Busch. In 1863 he obtained his habilitation for surgery and ophthalmology, and in 1869 was named an associate professor. As his career progressed his interest shifted towards dermatology, and through his initiative, an independent department of dermatology was created at the University of Bonn (1882). In 1894 he became an honorary full professor at the university.

From 1882 onward, he dedicated himself entirely to studies of skin and venereal diseases. He is especially known for his research involving the etiology and treatment of lupus vulgaris.

== Selected writings ==
- Tuberkelbacillen im Lupus, Monatsschrift für praktische Dermatologie II. No. 6.
- Über Bacillen bei Syphilis (with Jos. Schütz), Deutsche medizinische Wochenschrift, 1875.
- Fall von Meningitis tuberculosa nach Lupus; Tuberkelbacillen im Blut, Deutsche medizinische Wochenschrift Nr. 7, 1885.
- Zur Therapie des Rhinosclerom, Deutsche medizinische Wochenschrift, 1887.
- Lupus und Hauttuberculose, Deutsche medicinische Wochenschrift 1887. N0. 43.
- Syphilis und Carcinom, Deutsche medicinische Wochenschrift Leipzig, 1887, xiii. 1016-1018.
- Über Haut- und Schleimhauttuberculose, Deutsche medicinische Wochenschrift 1892, Nr. 46, S. 1033.
