= Ulrich Parzany =

German evangelical pastor (born 1941)

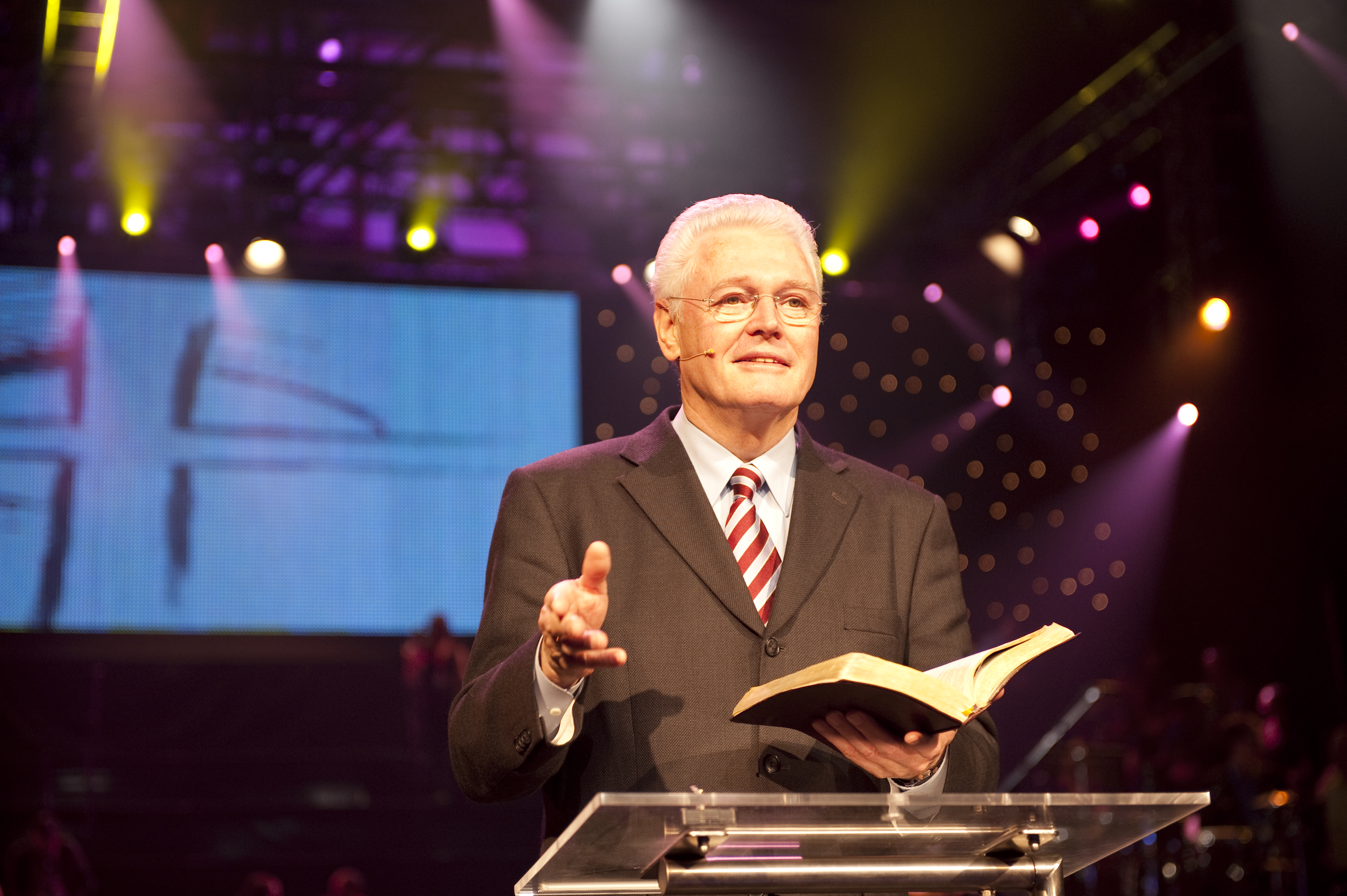
Ulrich Parzany

Ulrich Parzany (born 24 March 1941 in Essen) is a German evangelical pastor. He was Secretary-General of the German section of the YMCA and succeeded Billy Graham as leader of the evangelical organization ProChrist.

== Life ==
According to his own testimony, Parzany came to Christian faith in 1955 through the youth work of the Weigle House in Essen, where he was influenced by pastor Wilhelm Busch's "clear, illustrative and bold proclamation of the gospel". Parzany became Busch's pupil and co-worker, volunteering for missionary youth work at the Weigle House until 1961.

From 1960 until 1964, Parzany studied Lutheran theology in Wuppertal, Göttingen, Tübingen and Bonn. After receiving his ordination in 1967, Parzany returned to Essen and became leader of the Weigle House. There he began his supra-regional youth ministry. From October 1984 until October 2005 he served as Secretary General of the German section of the YMCA, and from 1987 until 2005 he served on the board of the Evangelische Allianz.

In October 1991 Parzany became involved in the ProChrist evangelical meetings, and he succeeded Billy Graham as the main speaker at these events, held every three years since the German reunification. From November 2002 until November 2005 Parzany also led the German section of the Lausanne Covenant.

Parzany was awarded the Bundesverdienstkreuz in 1998.
