= Museum of Antiquities of Leipzig University =

Museum of Antiquities of the University of Leipzig
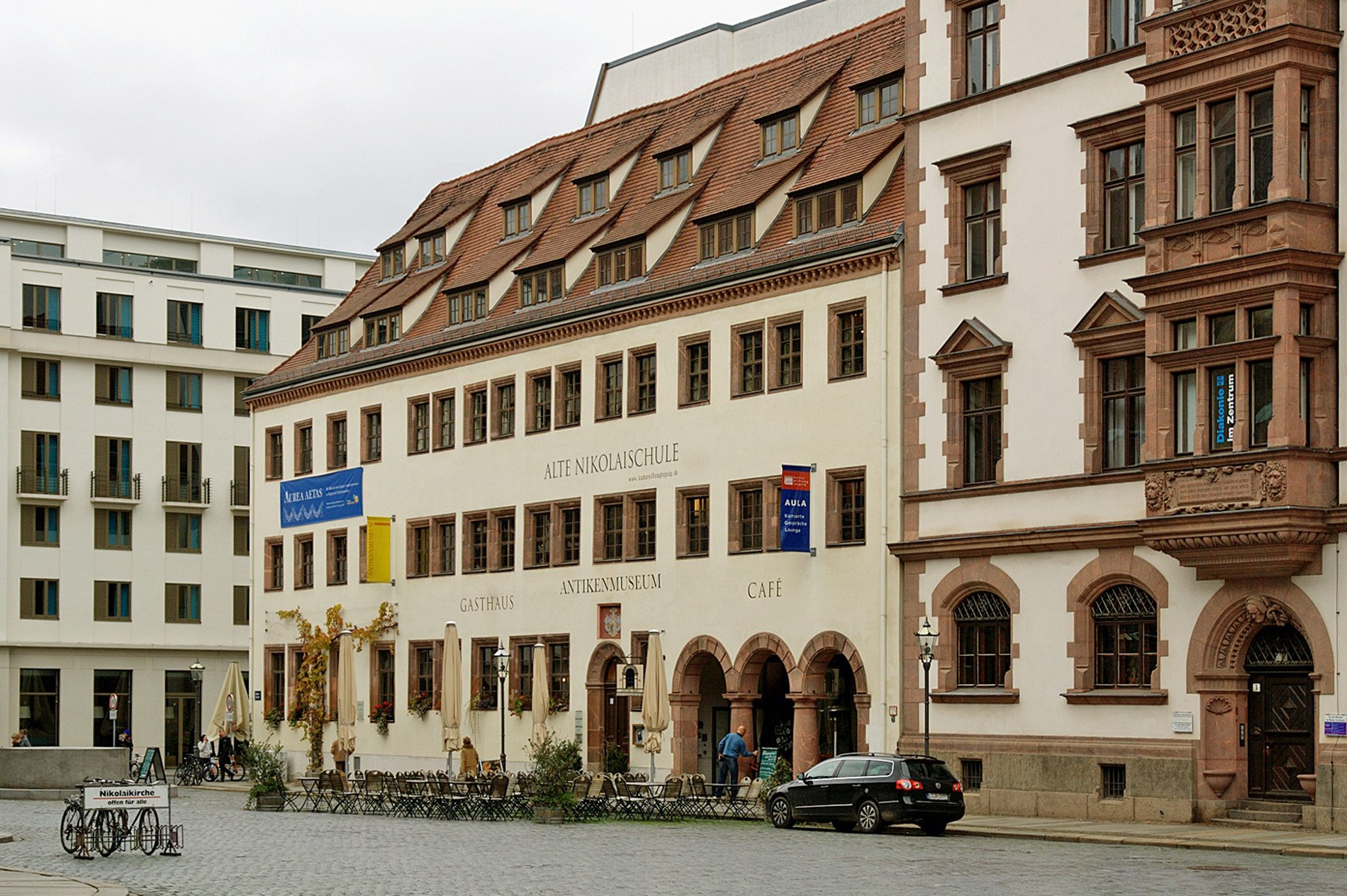
- Location: Leipzig, Germany
- Type: museum
- Website: Official website

The Museum of Antiquities of the University of Leipzig (German: Antikenmuseum der Universität Leipzig) is a collection of antiquities in Leipzig, Germany.

== History ==
The foundations of the collection were laid in the first half of the 18th century, with the first acquisitions of antiquities by the University. As early as 1735, Johann Friedrich Christ, archaeologist and professor of poetry, used antiquities from his ownership in lectures. In the early 19th century the antiquities collection acquired the title "Archaeology and Art Cabinet". While the emphasis of the collection was originally on antique coins, gems and plaster casts, this changed with the arrival of 50 Greek and Etruscan vases in Leipzig, courtesy of Eduard Gerhard. In the same year the collection was further expanded with antiquities purchased by one W. G. Becker during a tour of Italy. Numerous oil lamps, terracottas and rare sculptures were further acquired over the following years.

In the second half of the 19th century, under the leadership of Johannes Overbeck, new additions were mostly restricted to plaster casts. Original objects did not begin to be acquired again in significant numbers until 1897, with the purchase of Friedrich Hauser's collection, containing important antique items. In the first decade of the 20th century, under Franz Studniczka, the collection grew again with around 300 valuable exhibits endowed by Edward Perry Warren and John Marshall, including an important marble bust of Alexander the Great.

== Today ==
Today the collection contains around 10,000 original objects, chief among them numerous black- and red-figure vases, as well as over 600 plaster casts. In addition to acting as an educational resource for students, the museum has been exhibiting its most important finds to the general public since 1844. Since 1994 the collection has been on display in the Alte Nikolaischule.
