= Wilhelm Busch (pastor) =

German Christian pastor and resister of Nazism

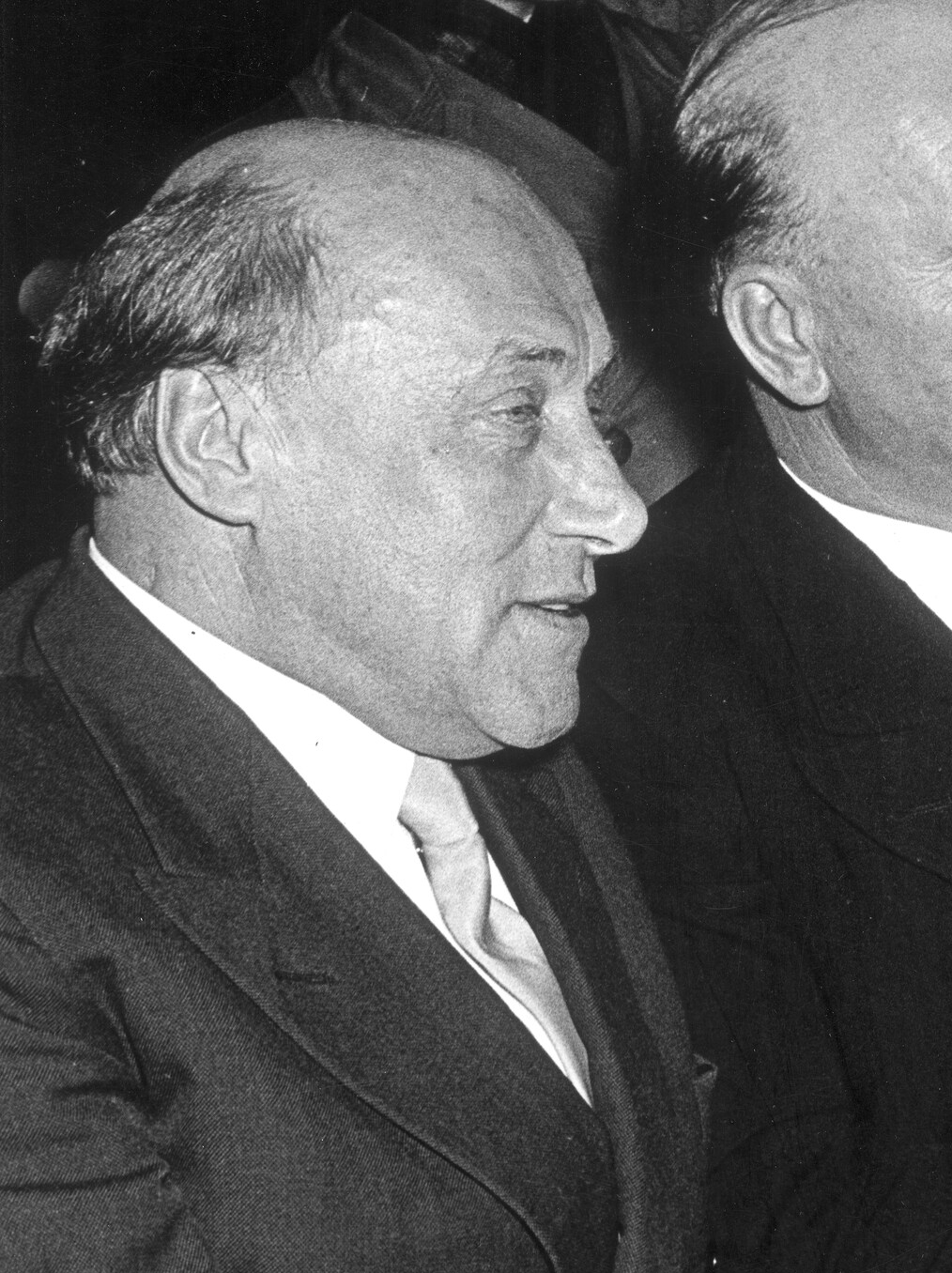
- Wilhelm Busch at Dortmund in 1966
- Born: 27 March 1897; Elberfeld, present-day Wuppertal, German Empire
- Died: 20 June 1966 (aged 69); Lübeck, West Germany
- Citizenship: Germany
- Occupations: Protestant pastor, youth evangelist, writer
- Known for: resistance against totalitarian Nazi regime, Evangelizations for youth, literary works, probably the most famous evangelistic book in German language; Citation: "Half-Christian is a full swindler."

Wilhelm Busch (27 March 1897 – 20 June 1966) was a German pastor, youth evangelist, writer and activist in the Confessing Church during the Nazi period in Germany.

== Life ==
Wilhelm Busch was born in Elberfeld on 27 March 1897, a son of pastor Dr. Wilhelm Busch. His mother, Johanna Busch, (née Kullen), came from the House of Kullen, Hülben (near Urach) which was rooted in Swabian Pietism. Although Wilhelm Busch came from a famous family of pastors, in his early years he was anything but religious. He spent his early life in Frankfurt where he pursued and finished his secondary school studies. After graduating he served with the German army as a young officer-lieutenant in World War I, where on the battlefield at Verdun he came to a personal faith in Christ when a comrade was hit by a grenade.

When the war was over he decided to study Protestant theology in Tübingen. After completing his studies he served six months as a vicar in the Lutheran Church at Gellershagen near Bielefeld where he met his future wife Emilie ("Emmi") Müller. In 1924 he became a pastor in Essen, where he started with an evangelistic Christian ministry especially to local miners. In 1929 he became a youth pastor in the Christian youth centre in Essen, later called Weigle-Haus (member of the western German CVJM/YMCA), established by his predecessor, Pastor Wilhelm Weigle. At the same time he was preaching evangelising sermons all over the country and abroad.

During the time of National Socialism he adopted the uncompromising position of the German Confessing Church against the influence of the Third Reich on the life of the Church. As an active member of this opposition to government-sponsored efforts to Nazify the German Protestant church, he proclaimed his faith openly and ignored orders to refrain from teaching the Bible — which earned him several arrests and lengthy jail confinements. Even under the Nazis, Pastor Busch managed to attract attendances of two to three hundred boys at his scripture lessons. He was holding Bible study meetings in private houses, in basements, and in the open air. His son never attended the meetings of the Hitler Youth though this was required by law. On one occasion in 1937 he was arrested right after evangelising in the church of St. Paul in Darmstadt due to Nazi authorities feeling upset over the capability of the Christian movement to attract the attention of the general public with Biblical messages and counter their own aspirations to control the masses. During the sermon, state officials tried to avoid a public uproar in the crowded Church and let him preach. After having been captured, an SS commissioner presented him official orders expelling him from the territory of Hessen. As he refused to accept due to his commitment to perform Biblical work among people as a pastor, he was immediately taken into custody.

During my life, I have passed through periods of various hard trials. Because of my faith I have been thrown into prisons on more than one occasion. Not because I had been stealing silver spoons or had committed some other crime. In the Third Reich, Nazis didn't like youth pastors like me, and that's why authorities kept throwing me into these pretty sinister places.

After World War II Busch renewed his activities as a youth pastor and itinerant evangelist with the slogan "Jesus our destiny" becoming the central topic of his ministry even after his official retirement in 1962.

He was a Christian pacifist.

Busch's pupils in the post-war era included Ulrich Parzany who said he was strongly affected by Busch's "clear, illustrative and bold proclamation of the gospel".

He died in hospital in Lübeck on 20 June 1966 while on the trip home after evangelising in Sassnitz on Rügen. The theme of his last sermon a day before had been "What's the point of life with God anyway?" ("Was hat man denn von einem Leben mit Gott?"). He was buried four days later. The funeral was attended by a number of people including the later President of the Federal Republic of Germany, Gustav Heinemann, who in his oration gave the following testimony about the late fellow:

Wherever he emerged, there was always something going on. The essential about him, however, was that as an ambassador of his Lord he was credible and penetrated all reservations. (Wo er zugegen war, passierte immer etwas. Das Eigentliche an ihm aber war dieses, dass er ein glaubhafter und aller Vorbehalte durchstoßender Bote seines Herrn war.)

== Weigle-Haus ==
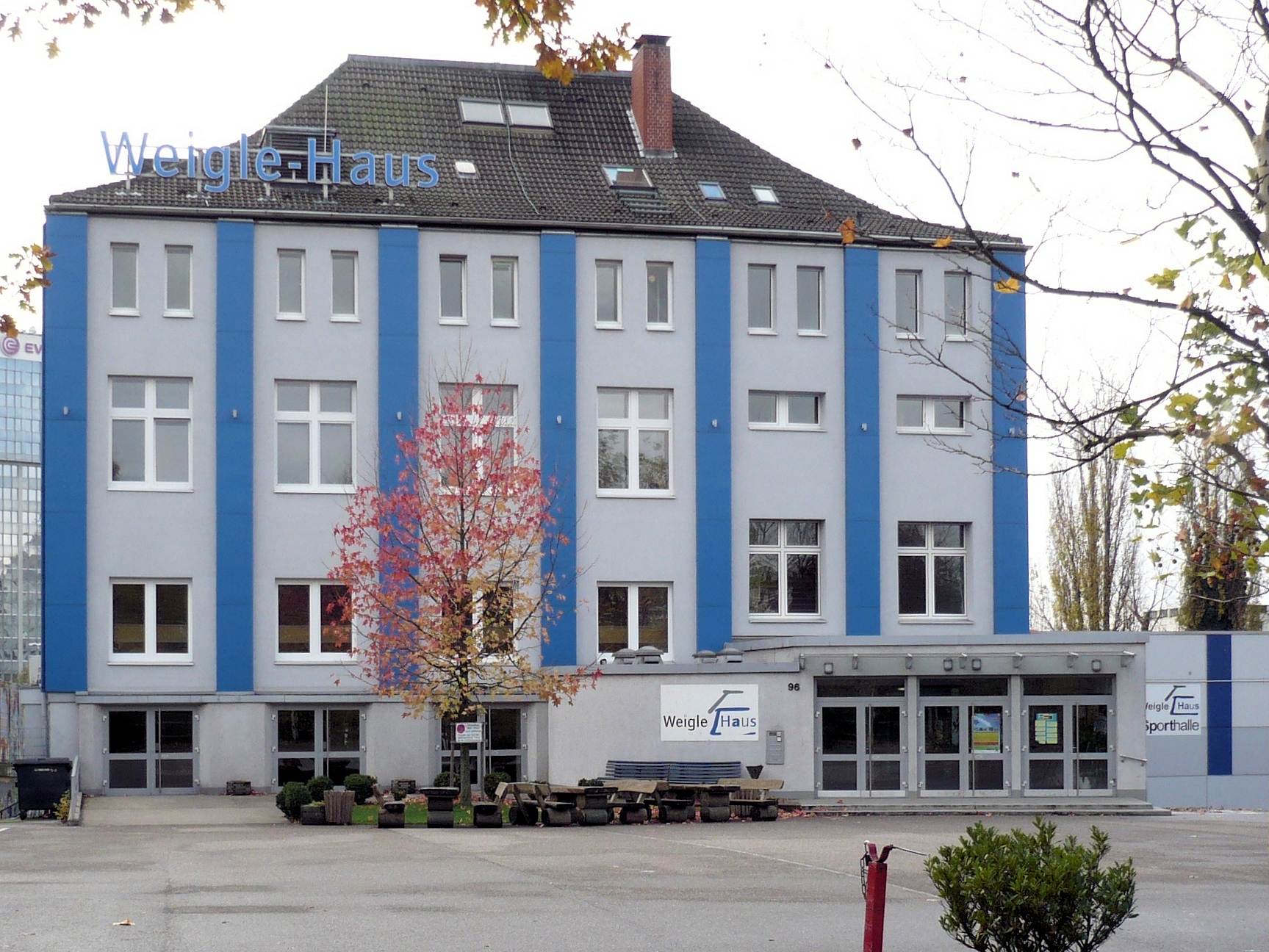
The Weigle-Haus in Essen, 2009.

Pastor Busch had taken over the leadership of the House in 1929, but on 11 February 1934 the Protestant youth club (Evangelische Jugendverein) was dissolved and the youth house closed. Busch resisted pressure to merge with the Hitlerjugend (Hitler Youth) and managed to reopen the house. Youth work continued under the name "City Mission" when the house itself received its present name, "Weigle-Haus".

Partially destroyed during World War II the house was reconstructed and reopened on 23 May 1954. Wilhelm Busch still led the work until his official retirement in 1962. Youth programs revolved mainly around the jointly spent Sundays with Church services, sports and games and even educational opportunities such as the so-called intelligence-club (Intelligenz-Club).

== Literary works ==
- Jesus Our Destiny (in German Jesus unser Schicksal) is the most well known of his works. It is based on a compilation of his radio speeches. A common theme in his speeches is the centrality of Jesus to Christian doctrine. Published after his death, this book has been translated into major world languages and attained a worldwide distribution of several million copies. The title "Jesus Our Destiny" comes from the main topic of big Evangelization that pastor Busch held in Essen in 1938.
- Kleine Erzählungen 1-5 (stories). Stuttgart, Quell-Verlag 1958 (new ed. 2005).

== Bibliography ==
- Becker, Wolfgang; Hahn, Eberhard; Hille, Rolf (1997). "Dein Wort ist die Wahrheit. Festschrift für Gerhard Maier". In Neudorfer, Heinz-Werner (ed.). Die Autorität der Heiligen Schrift in der evangelistischen Verkündigung. Zu einer These von Wolfgang Bub am Beispiel des Evangelisten Wilhelm Busch (in German). Wuppertal: R. Brockhaus. pp. 279–295. ISBN 3-417-29424-X.
- Becker, Wolfgang (2010). "'Beiträge zu Evangelisation und Gemeindeentwicklung". Wilhelm Busch als evangelistischer Verkündiger (in German). Neukirchen-Vluyn: Neukirchener Verlag. p. 14. ISBN 978-3-7887-2444-3.
- Busch, Emmi (1980). Ein Bündel Briefe (in German). Wuppertal: Aussaat- und Schriftenmissions-Verlag. ISBN 3-7958-0839-1.
- Busch, Wilhelm (2009). Plaudereien in meinem Studierzimmer [Small talks in my study] (in German) (11 ed.). Aussaat. p. 299. ISBN 978-3-7615-5704-4.
- Ehring, Karl-Heinz (1997). Ulrich Parzany (ed.). Begegnungen mit Wilhelm Busch [Meetings with Wilhelm Busch] (in German). Aussaat Verlag, Neukirchen-Vluyn. p. 95. ISBN 3-7615-3569-4.
- Parzany, Ulrich (1973). 'Im Einsatz für Jesus. Programm und Praxis des Jugendpfarrers Wilhelm Busch (in German). Gladbeck: Schriftenmissions-Verlag. ISBN 3-7615-3509-0.
- Staebler, Martin (2009). 'Pastor Wilhelm Busch. Biografische Notizen als Gestaltungsmittel der Verkündigung (in German) (chrismon ed.). Frankfurt am Main: Hansisches Druck- und Verlagshaus. ISBN 978-3-86921-010-0.
