= St. Nicholas Church, Leipzig =

Coordinates: 51°20′25″N 12°22′43″E

St. Nicholas Church
- Nikolaikirche
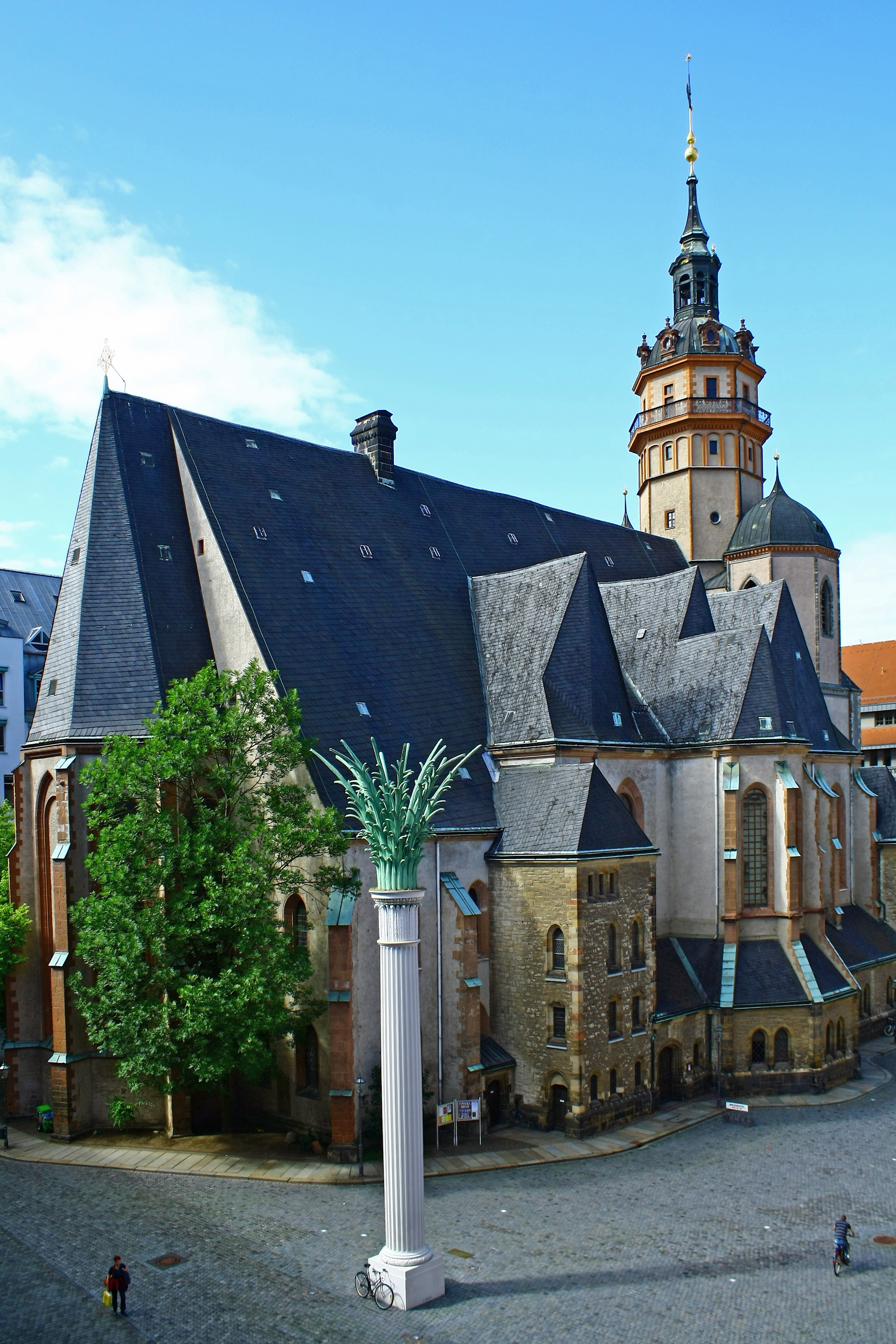
- Nikolaikirche in 2012
- St. Nicholas Church
- Location: Leipzig
- Country: Germany
- Denomination: Evangelical-Lutheran Church of Saxony
- Previous denomination: Roman Catholic
- Website: nikolaikirche.de

Architecture
- Style: Romanesque, Gothic, Baroque, Neoclassical (interior)
- Groundbreaking: c. 1165

Specifications
- Capacity: 1,400+

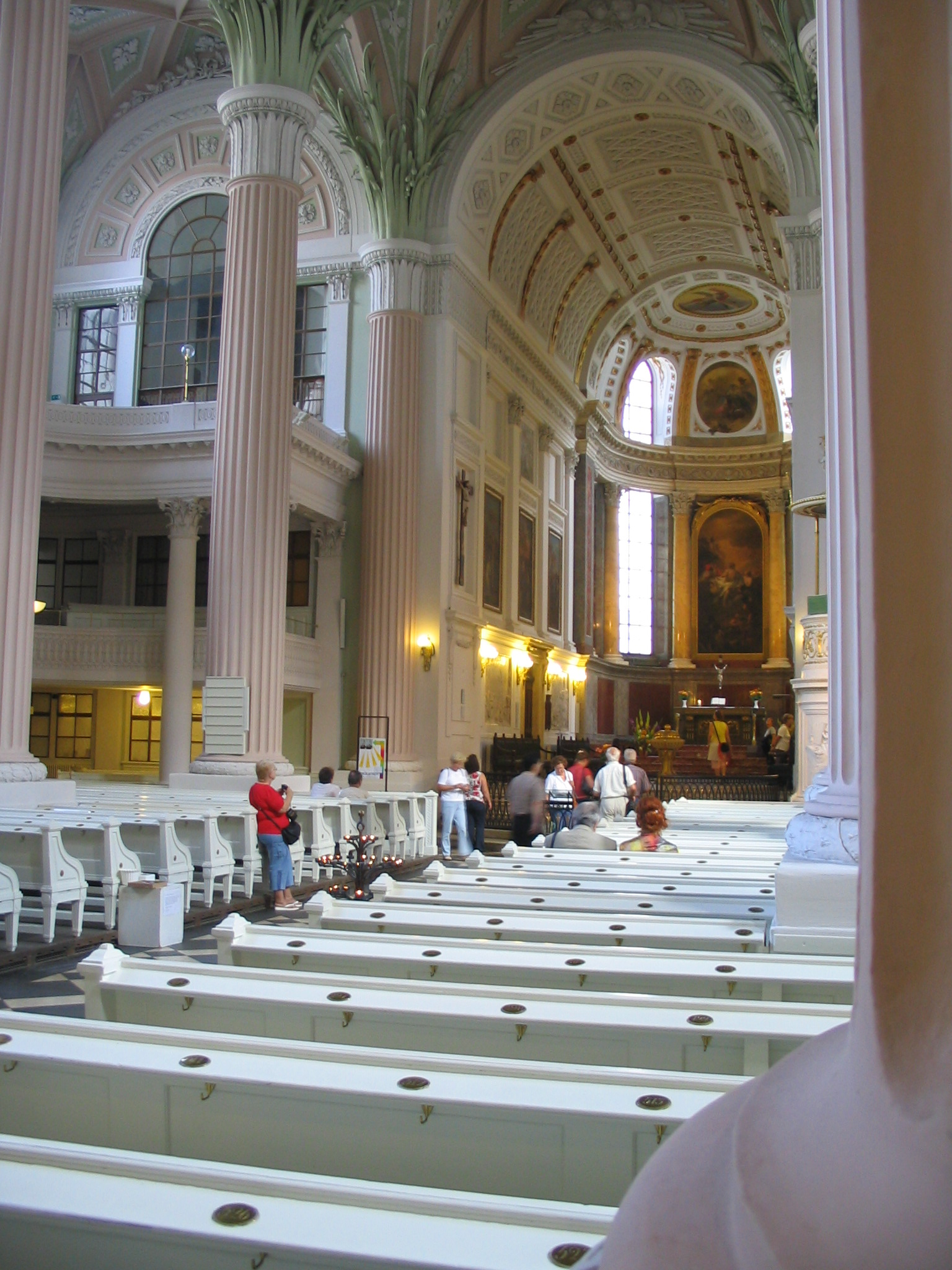
Interior, facing the altar

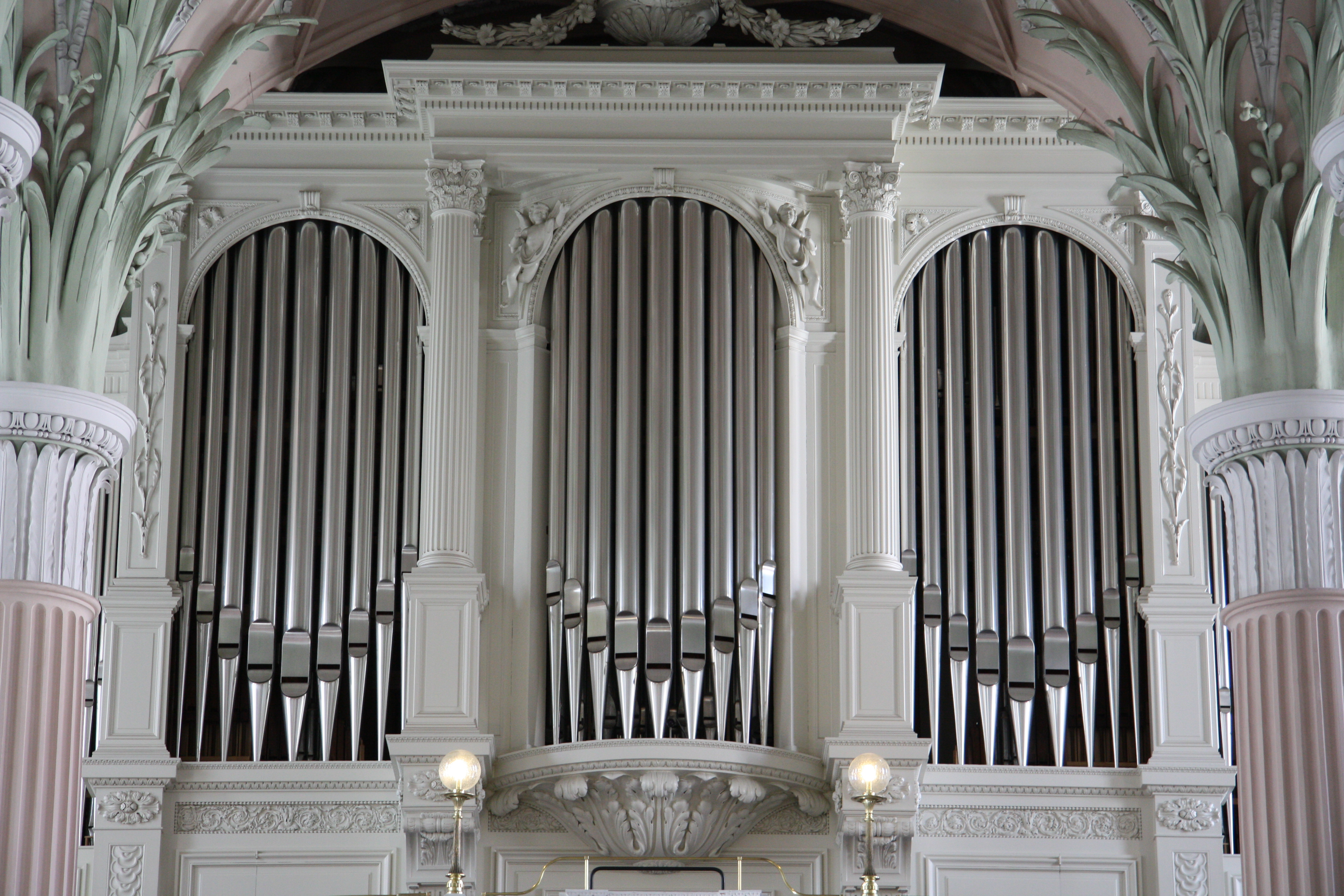
Organ with the Ladegast-Case from 1862

(video) External and internal views of Nikolaikirche on a snowy day, December 2014

The St. Nicholas Church (German: Nikolaikirche) is one of the major churches of central Leipzig, Germany (in Leipzig's district Mitte). Construction started in Romanesque style in 1165, but in the 16th century, the church was turned into a Gothic hall church. Baroque elements like the tower were added in the 18th century.

In the 18th century, several works by Johann Sebastian Bach, who was as Thomaskantor the music director of Thomaskirche and Nikolaikirche from 1723 to 1750, premiered here. The Neoclassical interior dates to the late 18th century.

The church rose to national fame in 1989 with the Monday Demonstrations when it became the centre of peaceful revolt against communist rule. By capacity, it is one of the largest churches in Saxony.

== History ==
Construction of the church began about 1165. It is named after Saint Nicholas, patron of travelers and merchants. It was built originally in the Romanesque style (with twin towers) but was extended and enlarged in the early 16th century in the Gothic style. The Baroque main tower was added in 1730; the portal dates from 1759.

Notable philosopher and mathematician Gottfried Wilhelm Leibniz was baptized here as an infant on 3 July 1646.

From 1784 to 1797 the interior was remodeled by German architect Johann Carl Friedrich Dauthe in the Neoclassical style. The church has been a Protestant seat since 1539 after the Protestant Reformation, but today the Catholic Church is also allowed to use it.

The church saw four of the five performances (including the premiere) of the St John Passion by Johann Sebastian Bach on Good Friday in 1724, 1728, 1732, and 1749, as well as many of his cantatas and oratorios performed by the Thomanerchor.

=== Peaceful demonstrations ===
From 1989 to 1991, people gathered at St. Nicholas on Monday evenings, leading to spontaneous peaceful protests against the government. Cabaret artist Bernd-Lutz Lange said about the events which started in the St. Nicholas Church:

"There was no head of the revolution. The head was the Nikolaikirche and the body the centre of the city. There was only one leadership: Monday, 5 pm, St. Nicholas Church."

== Description ==
=== Organ ===
The church organ was built by Friedrich Ladegast in 1862 with four manuals, chest sliders and 84 stops. During a renovation by Wilhelm Sauer in 1902–1903, the mechanical (tracker) action was replaced by a pneumatic action with cone-chests. Sauer added some late-romantic stops. In 2004, the company Eule Orgelbau restored the organ, reintroducing a tracker action and reconstructing lost Ladegast-stops. As of 2025, the instrument has five manuals, 106 stops, and is the largest organ in Saxony.

== Today ==
The current pastor for the church is Bernhard Stief.

Nikolaikirche has a capacity of over 1,400 seats.

== See also ==
- Architecture of Leipzig - Romanesque and Gothic
- St. Nicholas Church Square
- Nikolaikirche (1995 film)
- Leipzig Calvinist storm
