= Nikolaikirche (film) =

1995 film

Nikolaikirche is a 1995 German television film directed by Frank Beyer and based on a screenplay by Erich Loest, who later made it a novel.

The film concentrates on the last years of East Germany and tells the story of a family that is torn between the protest movement and the Stasi. The name of the film derives from the Nikolaikirche, one of the major churches of central Leipzig, which was the starting point for the Monday demonstrations. The film was produced in two different versions: a longer, two-part television version and a shorter theatrical version.
