= Wilhelm Busch (surgeon) =

German surgeon (1826–1881)

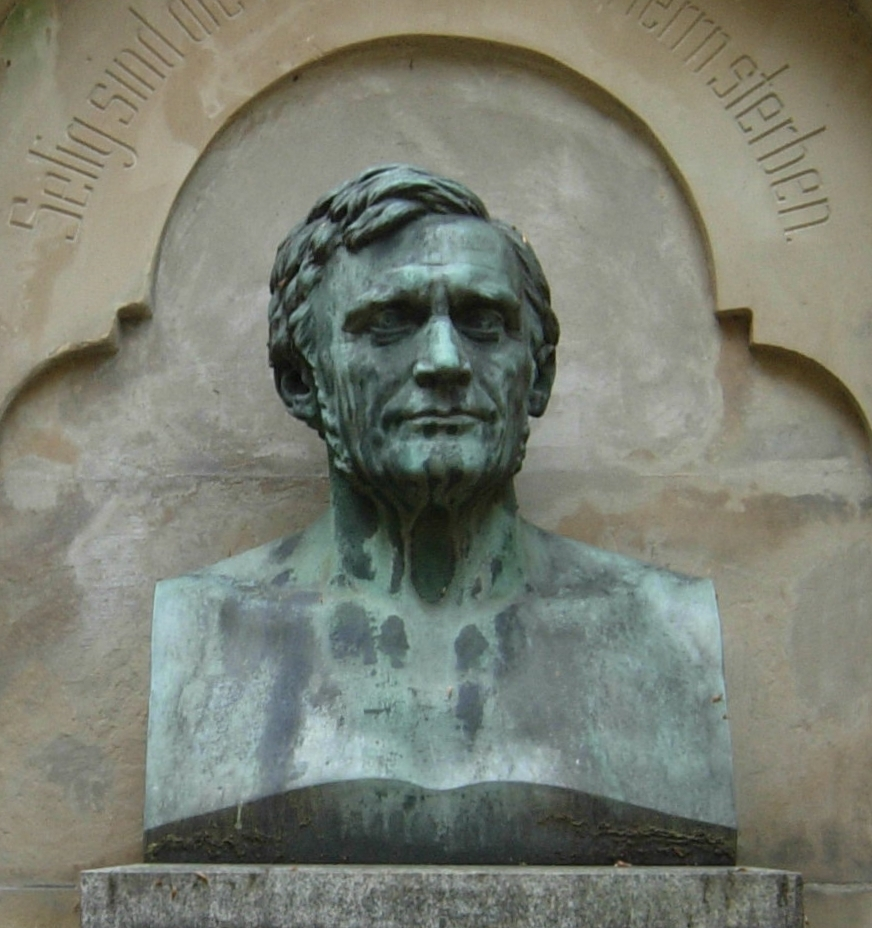
- Bust from Wilhelm's grave in Bonn.
- Born: January 1, 1826; Marburg, Prussia
- Died: November 24, 1881 (aged 55); Bonn, Germany
- Known for: Immunotherapy
- Scientific career
- Fields: Bacteriology, Surgeon, Physician
- Doctoral advisor: Johannes Peter Müller, Bernhard von Langenbeck
- Doctoral students: Joseph Doutrelepont

Karl David Wilhelm Busch (5 January 1826 in Marburg – 24 November 1881 in Bonn) was a German surgeon.

== Biography ==
Wilhelm Busch was born in Marburg in Prussia to Dietrich Wilhelm Heinrich Busch and Caroline Louise Marie Wagner. His father was a professor of gynecology at the University of Marburg. Busch studied at the University of Berlin, where he was a student under Johannes Peter Müller. Busch received his doctorate in 1848.

In 1851 he went to work and study under Bernhard von Langenbeck at the Royal Surgical University Clinic in Berlin.

In June 1853, Busch was married to Agnes Sophia Friederika (1830–1910), daughter of the chemist and mineralogist Eilhard Mitscherlich. His eldest daughter, Agnes Laura Carolina was born in 1854.

In 1855 he became an associate professor at the Rheinische Friedrich-Wilhelms-University in Bonn. At the same time he worked at the St. Johannes Hospital in Bonn. Afterwards Busch acted as consulting surgeon general in the army in 1866 and during the Franco-Prussian War. Among his students at Bonn was dermatologist Joseph Doutrelepont. In 1867 he became director of the Surgical Clinic of the University of Bonn (German: Chirurgischen Universitätsklinik Bonn).

He was a member of the Society of German Natural Scientists and Physicians. Busch's publications and lectures covered comparative anatomy, physiology, and pathology, as well as the contemporary disciplines of ophthalmology, urology, otolaryngology, and trauma surgery.

Busch died of appendicitis in 1881. His grave is in the Old Cemetery in Bonn.

His eldest daughter, Agnes Laura Carolina (* 1854), married the painter and author of art textbooks Ernest Preyer. His youngest daughter Frida Luise Bertha Busch (26 August 1868 – 31 August 1961), was the first female medical student in Bonn and, in 1903, the first woman to receive a doctorate from the Medical Faculty of the Rheinische Friedrich-Wilhelms-University.

== Immunotherapy ==
In 1866 Busch observed in his surgical practice two women who had sarcomas of the face and neck who subsequently came down with erysipelas. In both women the tumors shrank dramatically and one experienced complete remission. In 1867 Busch decided to induce the natural effect he had observed. Busch cauterized the tumor in the neck of a 19 year-old woman with a sarcoma. The wound was then deliberately infected with the sheets from a patient who had died from erysipelas. Over the course of nine days, the tumor shrank.

== Works ==
- Chirurgische Beobachtungen, gesammelt in der Klinik zu Berlin (Surgical observations gathered in the clinic at Berlin; 1854).
- Lehrbuch der Chirurgie (Textbook of surgery; 2 vols., 1857–69).
