= Timeline of Leipzig =

The following is a timeline of the history of the German city of Leipzig.

== Prior to 18th century ==
- 5600 to 4900 BC - Linear Pottery culture, archaeological finds near Leipzig like the Linear Pottery Well Altscherbitz
- 920 AD - Emperor Henry the Fowler "built a castle here about 920."
- 1015 - Leipzig is mentioned in Thietmar's chronicle as Urbs Lipzi.
- 1082 - Leipzig sacked by forces of Vratislaus II of Bohemia.
- 1134 - Leipzig "came into the possession of Conrad, Margrave of Meissen".
- 1165
  - Leipzig granted market and city privileges.
  - St. Nicholas Church built (approximate date).
- 1170 - Easter and Michaelmas fairs begin (approximate date).
- 1212 - Thomasschule zu Leipzig and Thomanerchor founded.
- 1231 - Klosterkirche St. Pauli built.
- 1409 - University of Leipzig founded.
- 1420 - Fire.
- 1458 - New year's fair begins, see also: Leipzig Christmas Market.
- 1479 - Printing press in operation.
- 1485 - Treaty of Leipzig.
- 1496 - St. Thomas Church consecrated.
- 1512 - 6 December (St. Nicholas Day), Old St Nicholas School (Alte Nikolaischule), Leipzig's first non-church secondary school, inaugurated.
- 1519 - June: Martin Luther and Andreas Karlstadt debate John Eck.
- 1530 - Auerbachs Keller built (approximate date).
- 1539 - "Leipsic formally espoused the Protestant cause."
- 1542 - Leipzig Botanical Garden first established.
- 1543 - Leipzig University Library established.
- 1547
  - City besieged by John Frederick I of Saxony.
  - Pleissenburg re-built, replaced in 1905 by the New Town Hall.
- 1554 - Moritzbastei constructed.
- 1555 - Alte Waage built.
- 1556 - Old City Hall built.
- 1593 - Leipzig Calvinist storm: houses of wealthy Calvinist-minded merchants were stormed and plundered.

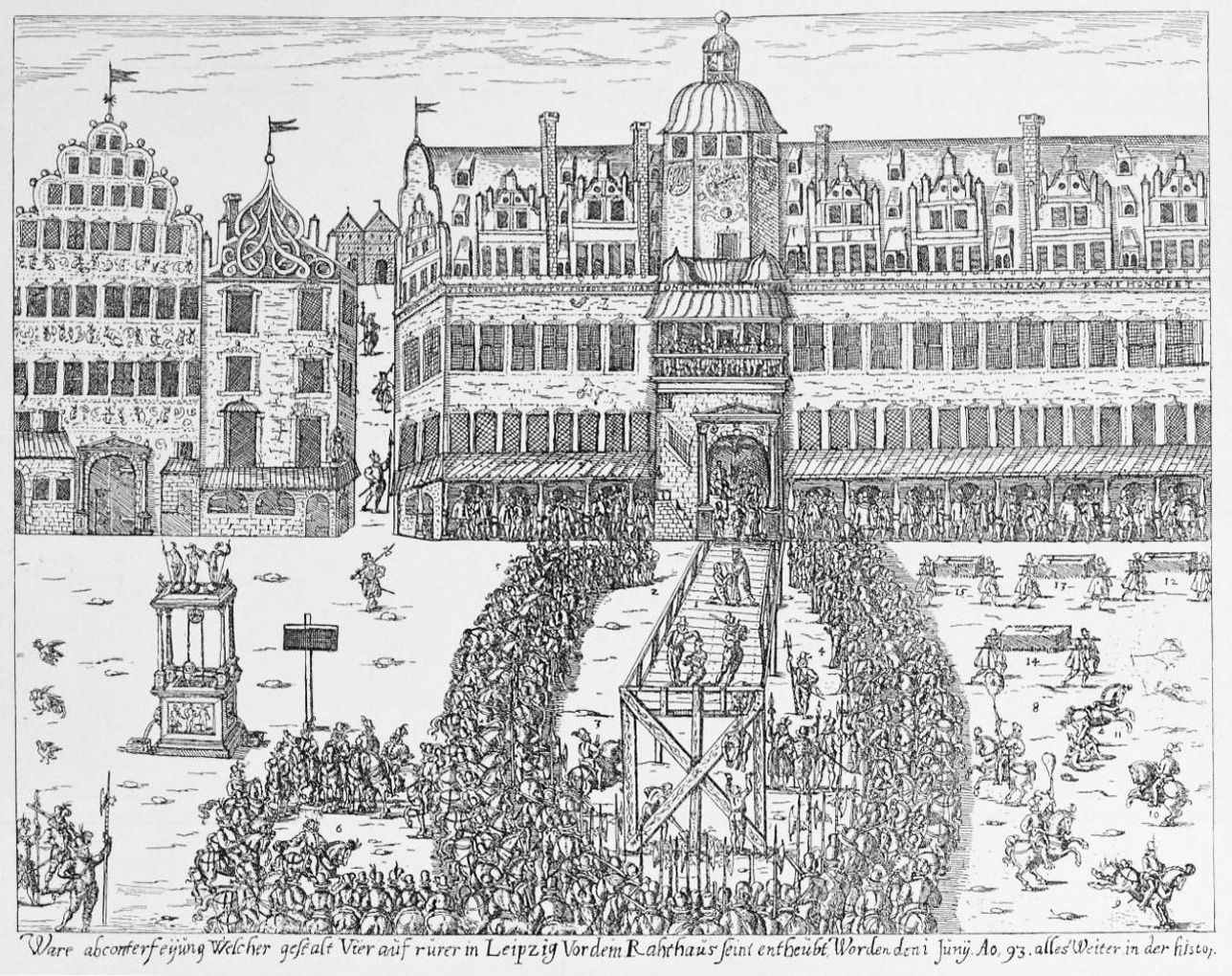
1 June 1593: Execution on the market square

- 1631
  - 1 September: Purchase of the Rosental.
  - September: Battle of Breitenfeld (1631).
- 1642 - Battle of Breitenfeld (1642).
- 1650 - Einkommende Zeitungen (newspaper) begins publication.
- 1680 - Plague.
- 1681 - Weidmannsche Buchhandlung relocates to Leipzig.
- 1687 - Alte Handelsbörse (trade exchange) built, see also Leipzig merchant bourgeoisie.
- 1693 - Opera house opens.
- 1699 - Population: 15,653.

== 18th century ==
- 1701 - Oil-fuelled street lighting introduced.
- 1702 - Collegium Musicum founded.
- 1704 - Romanus House built.
- 1705 - Former mayor Franz Conrad Romanus arrested.
- 1706 - Polish Preaching Society established.
- 1710 - King Augustus II the Strong first presented Meissen porcelain at the local fair.
- 1716 - Sorbian Lusatian Preaching Society established.
- 1717 - What became Schillerhaus first built.
- 1723
  - Breitkopf publishing established.
  - Johann Sebastian Bach begins as Kapellmeister (music director) at St. Thomas Church
- 1724 - Premiere performance of Bach's St John Passion.
- 1729 - Premiere of Bach's St Matthew Passion.
- 1731 - Zedler's Universal-Lexicon encyclopedia published.
- 1745 - City "taken by the Prussians."
- 1750
  - Death of Johann Sebastian Bach Kapellmeister of St. Thomas Church
  - Barthels Hof built.
- 1755 - Stadtbibliothek Leipzig (municipal library) opens.
- 1756
  - Gohlis Palace (Gohliser Schlößchen) built.
  - City occupied by Prussian forces during the Seven Years' War.
- 1759
  - August: "Prussians withdraw from Leipzig."
  - September: "Prussians recapture Leipzig."
- 1760 - October: "Prussians withdraw from Leipzig."
- 1764 - Academy of Visual Arts and Leipzig Economic Society founded.

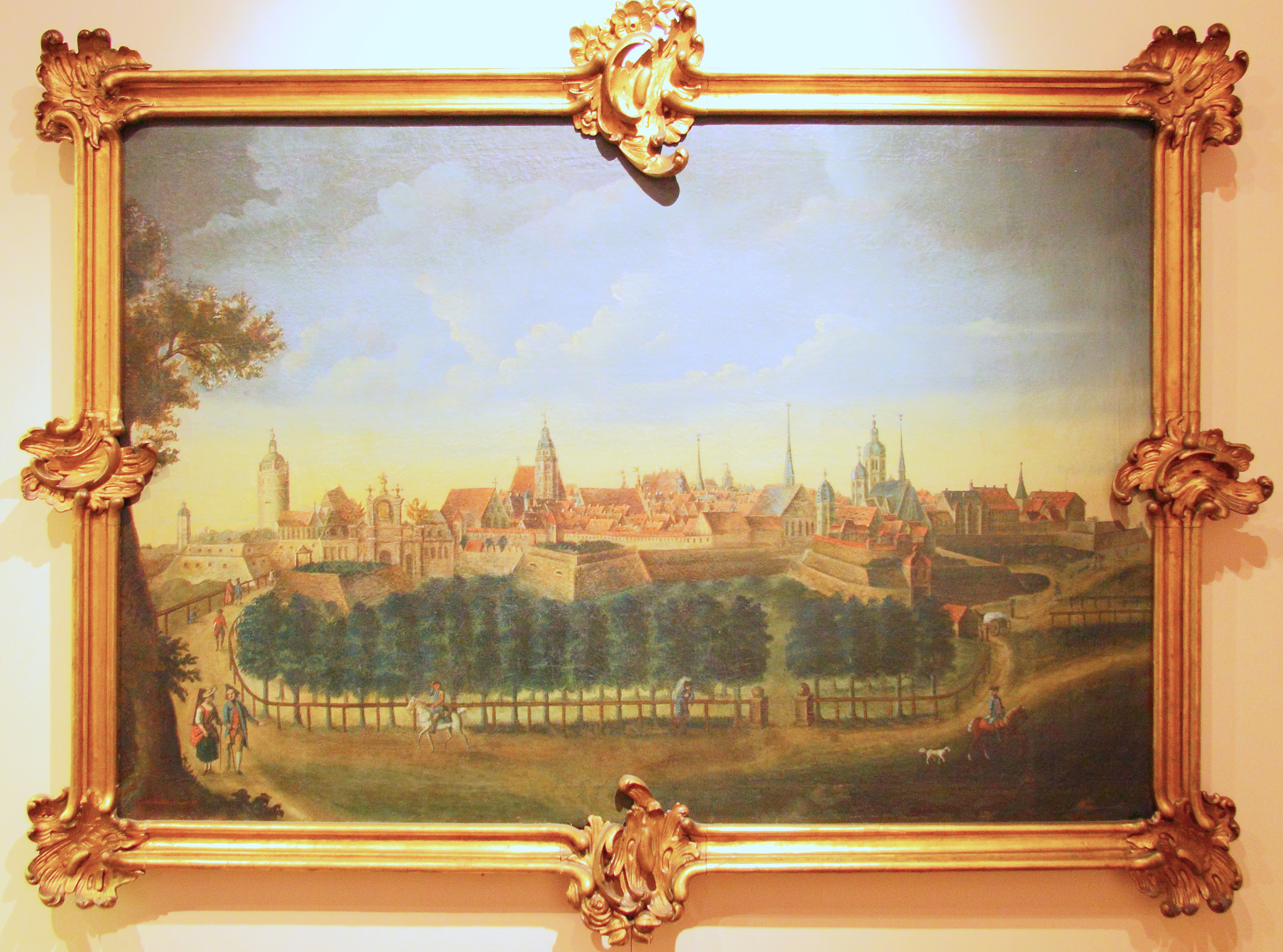
Leipzig on the Schildbach Painting (1765)

- 1766 - Theater auf der Rannischen Bastei opens.
- 1768 - Societas Jablonoviana founded by Józef Aleksander Jabłonowski.
- 1777 - April: Premiere of Klinger's play Sturm und Drang.
- 1781
  - Gewandhaus built.
  - Leipzig Gewandhaus Orchestra formed.
- 1784
  - City fortifications dismantled. Step by step the Promenadenring is created.
  - Philological Society founded.
- 1785 - Augustusplatz laid out.
- 1789 - Linnean Society founded.
- 1790 - Observatory set up in Pleissenburg.
- 1797 - Population: 31,847.
- 1798
  - Tauchnitz publishers established.
  - Allgemeine musikalische Zeitung (music magazine) begins publication.

== 19th century ==
- 1800 - Edition Peters and Leipzig Singakademie (chorus) established.
- 1801 - Population: 31,887.
- 1807
  - Friedrich Hofmeister Musikverlag (publisher) founded.
  - Leipziger Tageblatt (newspaper) begins publication.
- 1810 - Westermann Verlag founded.

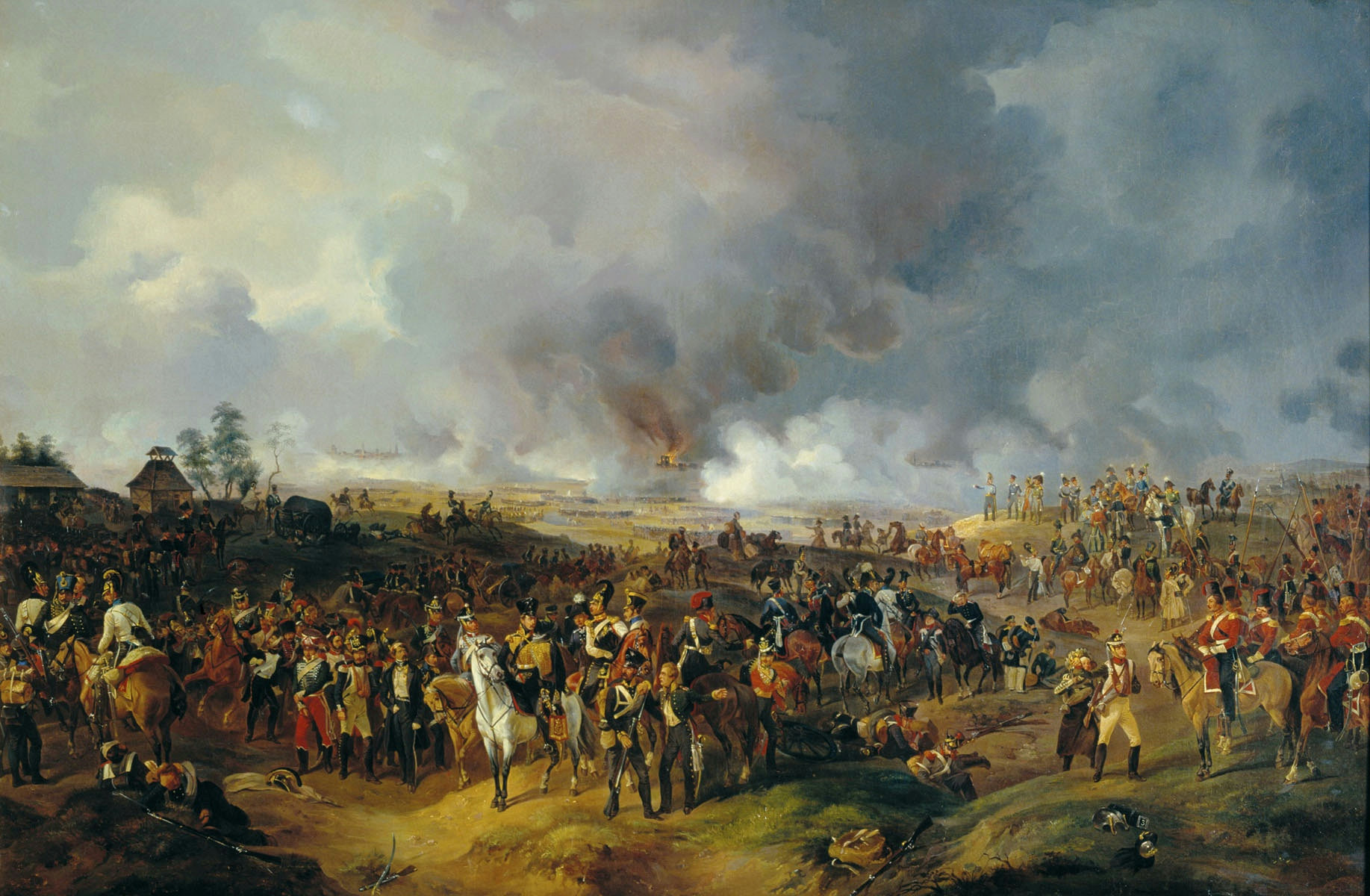
Battle of the Nations

- 1813
  - 22 May: Richard Wagner born.
  - October: Battle of Leipzig.
- 1824
  - Abolition of the Torgroschen (Gate penny) at the Leipzig City Gates.
  - Execution of Johann Christian Woyzeck as the last one on the Markt.
- 1825 - Börsenverein der Deutschen Buchhändler formed.
- 1826
  - Consulate of the United States established.
  - Wool market active.
- 1828
  - Reclam Verlag established.
  - Hôtel de Pologne founded.
- 1829 - Medical Society founded.
- 1830 - "Political disturbance."
- 1831
  - November: Establishment of a committee to help Polish insurgents fleeing the Russian Partition of Poland after the unsuccessful Polish November Uprising. Collection of funds to help Poles, mainly among guilds and city guards.
  - Flight of Polish insurgents from the Russian Partition of Poland to the Great Emigration through the city begins.
- 1832
  - January: Mass escape of Polish insurgents from the Russian Partition of Poland through the city.
  - January: Polish national hero Józef Bem expelled from the city by authorities fearful of stirring up a revolution.
  - July: The committee to help Poles officially closed, although its members continued their activities in the following years.
- 1833 - Accession to the Zollverein.
- 1835 - Felix Mendelssohn becomes music director of Leipzig Gewandhaus Orchestra.
- 1836 - Augusteum built.
- 1837 - Leipziger Kunstverein (art association) established.

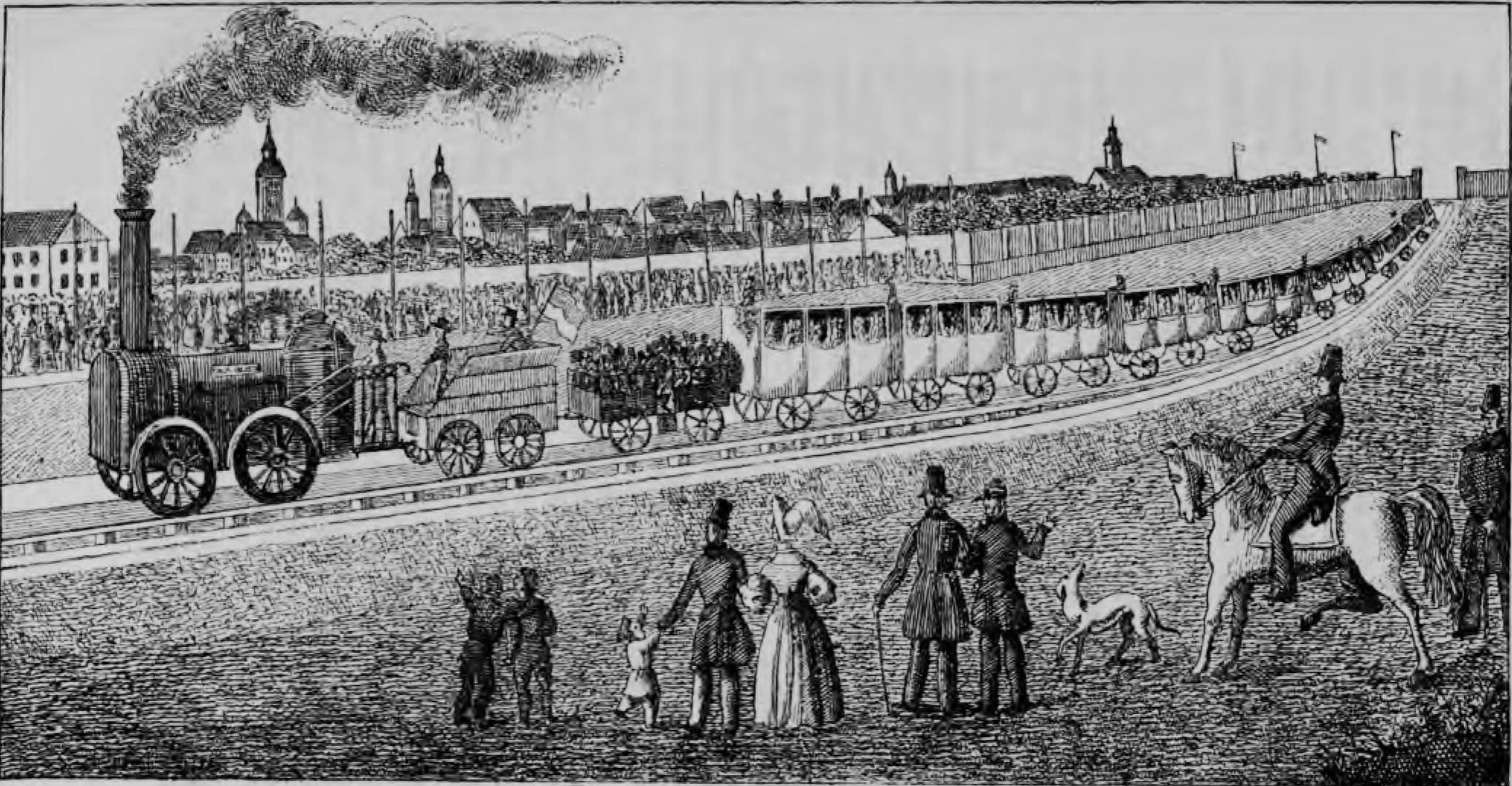
An early train in Leipzig (1837)

- 1839 - Leipzig–Dresden railway opened.
- 1842 - Leipzig Bayerischer Bahnhof built.
- 1843
  - Illustrirte Zeitung (newspaper) begins publication.
  - Conservatory of Music founded.
  - Bach monument, Leipzig erected.
- 1844 - Museum of Antiquities of Leipzig University on display.
- 1846
  - 1 July: Saxonian Academy of Sciences and Humanities founded.
  - 29 August: Hôtel de Pologne fire.
- 1848
  - "Museum of Fine Arts" founded.
  - Hôtel de Pologne rebuilt as the city's largest hotel.
  - "Political disturbance."
- 1850 - Bach Gesellschaft organized.
- 1853 - Blüthner piano manufacturer in business.
- 1855 - Leipzig synagogue built on Gottschedstrasse.
- 1856 - Händel-Gesellschaft organized.
- 1858 - Municipal museum inaugurated.
- 1861 - Population: 78,495.
- 1863
  - Johannapark created.
  - General German Workers' Association founded in Leipzig.
  - Bridge blasting monument inaugurated, exactely 50 years after the Battle of Leipzig.
- 1864
  - 25 June: First section of the Karl Heine Canal inaugurated.
  - Schrebergärten (community garden) association formed.
- 1866 - Austro-Prussian War leads to Prussian occupation in 1866–67.
- 1868 - Opera house built.
- 1869
  - Leipzig Museum of Ethnography founded.
  - Leipzig Alpine Club founded.
- 1872
  - Harrassowitz publishing firm established.
  - Verlag Karl Baedeker relocates to Leipzig.
  - Trams in Leipzig start.
- 1874
  - Museum of Arts and Crafts founded.
  - Ernst Eulenburg (musical editions) established.
  - Bibliographisches Institut relocates to Leipzig.
- 1878
  - Leipzig Zoo opens.
  - "Leipzig is growing into an industrial town of the first rank."
- 1879
  - Reichsgericht headquartered in Leipzig.
  - Südfriedhof established.
- 1880 - Population: 149,081.

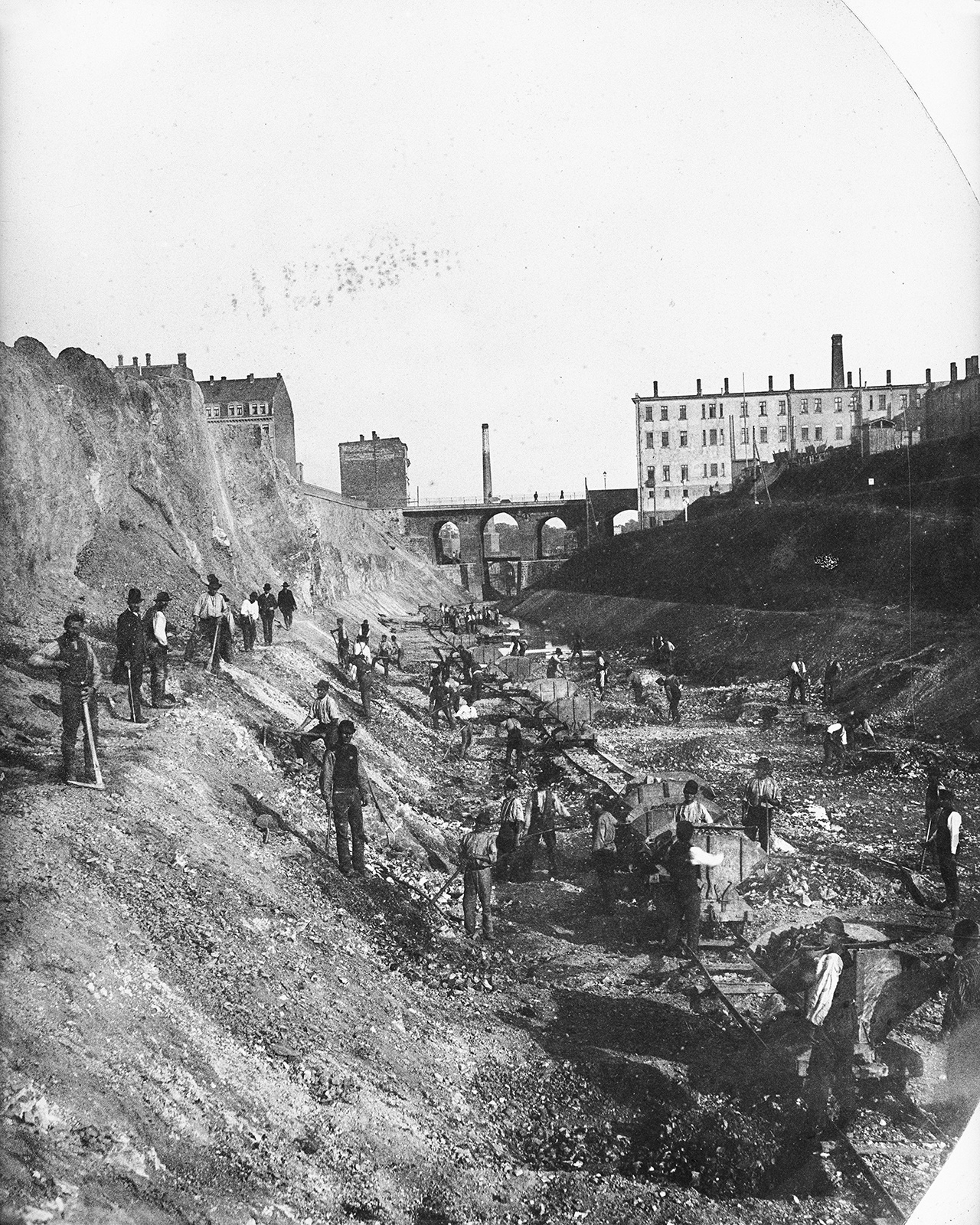
Digging the Karl Heine Canal (1884/85)

- 1884 - Leipziger Baumwollspinnerei founded.
- 1885
  - June: Anglican All Saints' Church consecrated.
- 1886
  - Georg Thieme Verlag established.
  - Lutherkirche (Leipzig) and Neue Börse (Leipzig) (stock exchange) built.
- 1889 - Anger-Crottendorf and Reudnitz (Leipzig) become part of city.
- 1890
  - Eutritzsch, Gohlis, Neureudnitz, Neuschönefeld, Neustadt, Sellerhausen, Thonberg, and Volkmarsdorf become part of city.
  - Population: 295,025.
- 1891
  - Leipzig University Library opens in relocation.
  - Connewitz, Kleinzschocher, Lindenau, Lössnig, Plagwitz, and Schleußig become part of city.
- 1892
  - Neusellerhausen becomes part of city.
  - SSV Stötteritz football club founded.
  - Mendelssohn monument erected.

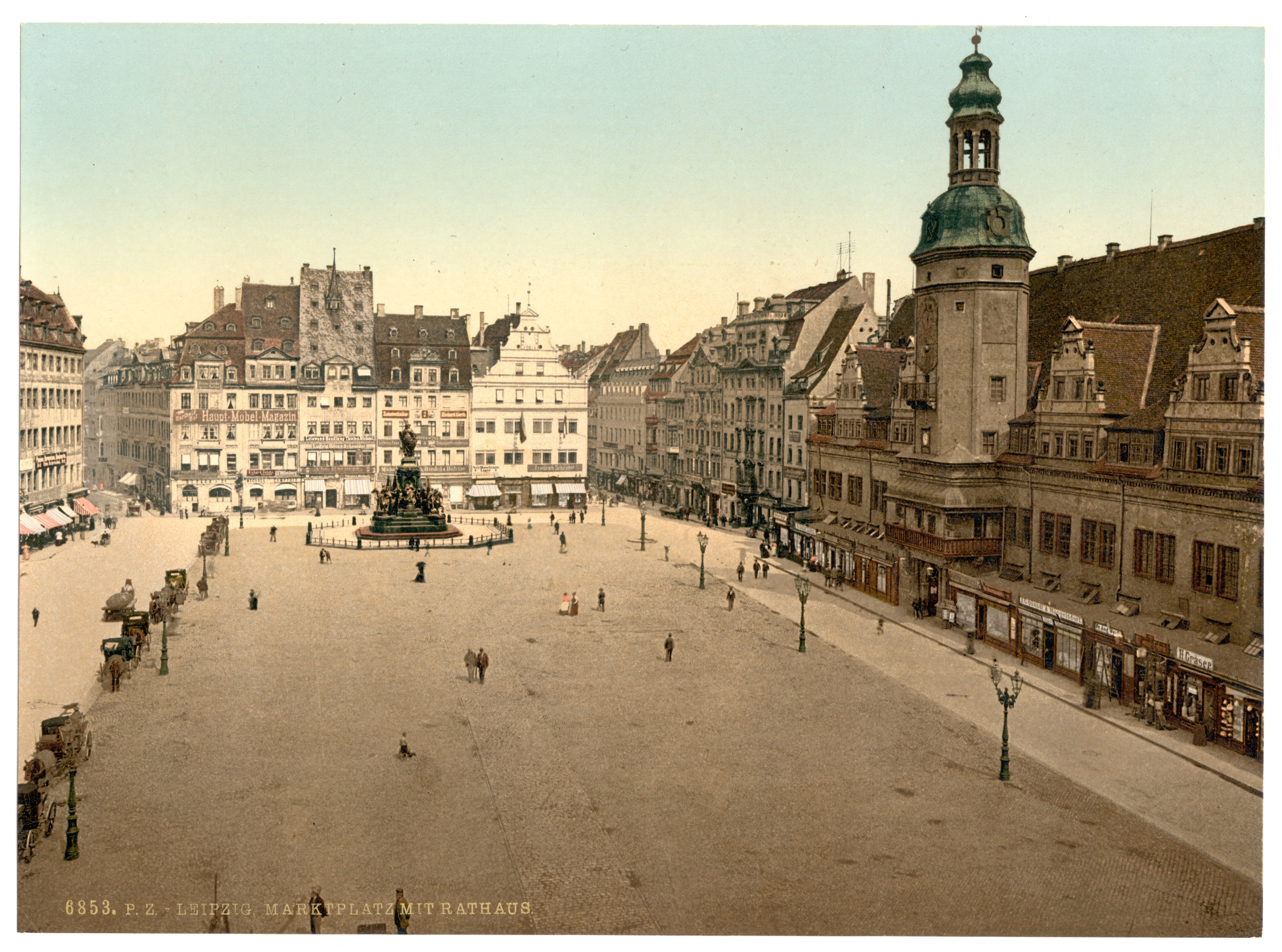
Market Square in the 1890s

- 1894 - Leipziger Volkszeitung (newspaper) begins publication.
- 1895
  - Reichsgericht (supreme court) established.
  - Altes Grassimuseum built.
  - Muster-Messe fair begins.
  - Population: 399,995.
- 1897 - Sächsisch-Thüringische Industrie- und Gewerbeausstellung (Litt.: Saxon-Thuringian industrial and commercial exhibition) in Leipzig.
- 1898 - Handelshochschule Leipzig founded.
- 1900 - Population: 456,156.

== 20th century ==
- 1901
  - Städtisches Kaufhaus built.
  - Insel Verlag (publisher) in business.
- 1904
  - Bachfest begins.
  - Leipzig Wildlife Park (Wildpark Leipzig) founded.
- 1905
  - Reudnitz, Volkmarsdorf, Gohlis, Eutritzsch were incorporated with the city.
  - New Town Hall opens. The Old Town Hall is going to house the Museum of the History of the City of Leipzig.
  - Population: 503,672.
- 1906
  - Naturkundemuseum Leipzig established.
  - Leipzig Prison built.
- 1907 - Edeka founded at Hôtel de Pologne.
- 1908 - Rowohlt Verlag founded.
- 1912 - German National Library established.
- 1913
  - Kurt Wolff Verlag (publisher) in business.
  - Monument to the Battle of the Nations erected.
  - 19 October: "Deutsche Lebens-Rettungs-Gesellschaft (DLRG)" (German Life Saving Association) founded in Leipzig.
- 1914 - Mädler Arcade Gallery built.
- 1915
  - Leipzig Hauptbahnhof and Alfred-Kunze-Sportpark open.
  - Mockau and Schönefeld become part of city.
- 1916
  - German National Library building opened.
  - Institute for Newspaper Research (Institut für Zeitungskunde) was founded at the University of Leipzig
- 1917
  - January: Leipziger Verkehrsbetriebe (city transport company) formed.
  - February: American Consulate closed. Its building became a temporary residence for Americans and Allied refugees from Serbia, Romania and Japan.
  - Hôtel de Pologne closed.
- 1918

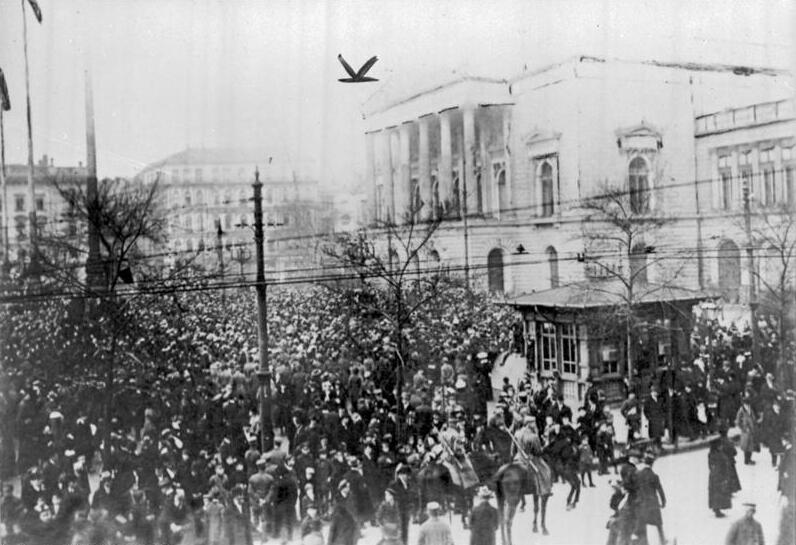
German revolution of 1918–1919 on Augustusplatz in Leipzig

  - Karl Rothe becomes mayor.
  - Zeppelin Bridge completed.
- 1919
  - Church Music Institute founded.
  - Der Drache begins publication.
  - Population: 604,397.
- 1920 - First technical trade fair on the Alte Messe site.
- 1921
  - Leipzig War Crimes Trials held.
  - December: American Consulate reopened.
- 1922
  - Grosszschocher, Leutzsch, Paunsdorf, and Wahren become part of city.
  - Bruno-Plache-Stadion opens.
  - Goldmann (publisher) founded.
- 1923
  - 1 January: Consulate of Poland opened.
  - MDR Symphony Orchestra founded.
- 1927 - Leipzig/Halle Airport opened.
- 1928
  - 1 August: Opening of the Kroch High-rise.
  - Specks Hof completed.
- 1929 - Museum of Musical Instruments of the University of Leipzig opens.
- 1930
  - 1 January: Europahaus as the second high rise of Leipzig opened.
  - Rundling and Krochsiedlung built.
  - Abtnaundorf, Knautkleeberg, Schönau, and Thekla become part of city.
- 1933 - Population: 713,470.
- 1935 - Portitz becomes part of city.
- 1936 - Knauthain and Lauer become part of city.

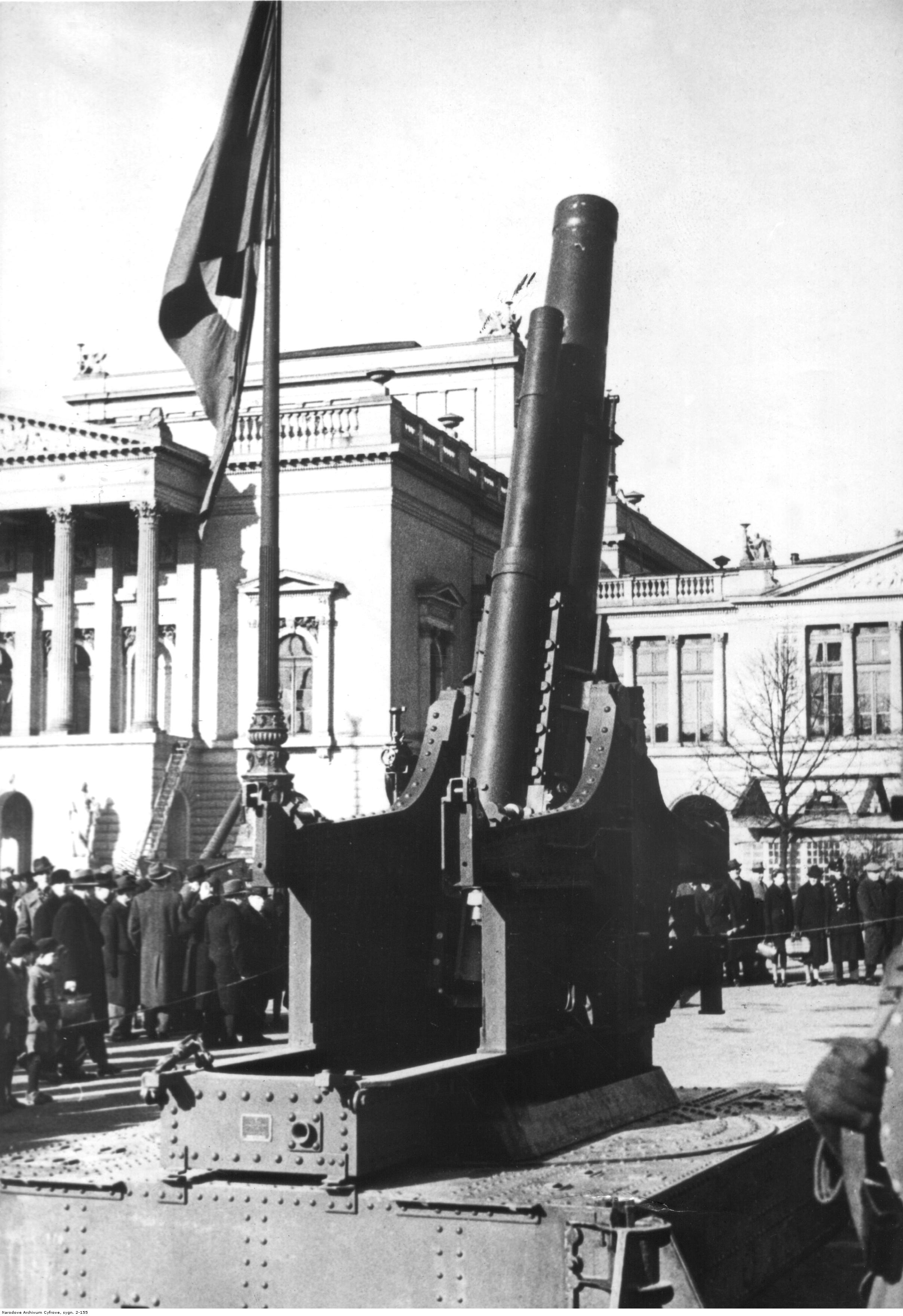
Polish armaments seized during the invasion of Poland on display at the 1939 Leipzig Trade Fair

- 1938
  - Expulsion of Polish Jews by Nazi Germany. 1,300 Polish Jews sheltered in the Polish Consulate and saved from deportation.
  - 9–10 November: Kristallnacht in Leipzig
- 1939
  - Leipzig Meuten dissolved by the Gestapo.
  - September: Mass arrests of local Polish activists (see also Nazi crimes against the Polish nation).
  - September: Polish Consulate seized by Germany during the invasion of Poland at the start of World War II. Confiscation of the Polish Consulate's library.
- 1941 - German-ordered closure of the American Consulate.
- 1942 - 23 June: Leipzig L-IV experiment accident is the first nuclear accident in history.
- 1943
  - 6 March: Leipzig-Thekla subcamp of the Buchenwald concentration camp established. Over 1,800 men, mostly Soviet, Polish, French, Belgian and Czechoslovak, were held there as slave labour.
  - December: Bombing of city by British.
- 1944
  - Bombing.
  - 11 May: Leipzig-Engelsdorf subcamp of the Buchenwald concentration camp established. Over 250 men, mostly Polish, Russian, Czech and Ukrainian, were held there.
  - 9 June: HASAG Leipzig subcamp of the Buchenwald concentration camp established. Over 5,000 women and children, mostly Polish, Soviet, French and Jewish, were held there.
  - 22 August: Leipzig-Schönau subcamp of the Buchenwald concentration camp established. Over 500 Jewish women were held there.
  - 15 November: Subcamp of Buchenwald for men established at the HASAG factory. Around 700 men, mostly Jewish, French and Italian, were held there.
  - 24 November: Leipzig-Engelsdorf subcamp dissolved. Prisoners deported to Wansleben am See and Rothenburg.

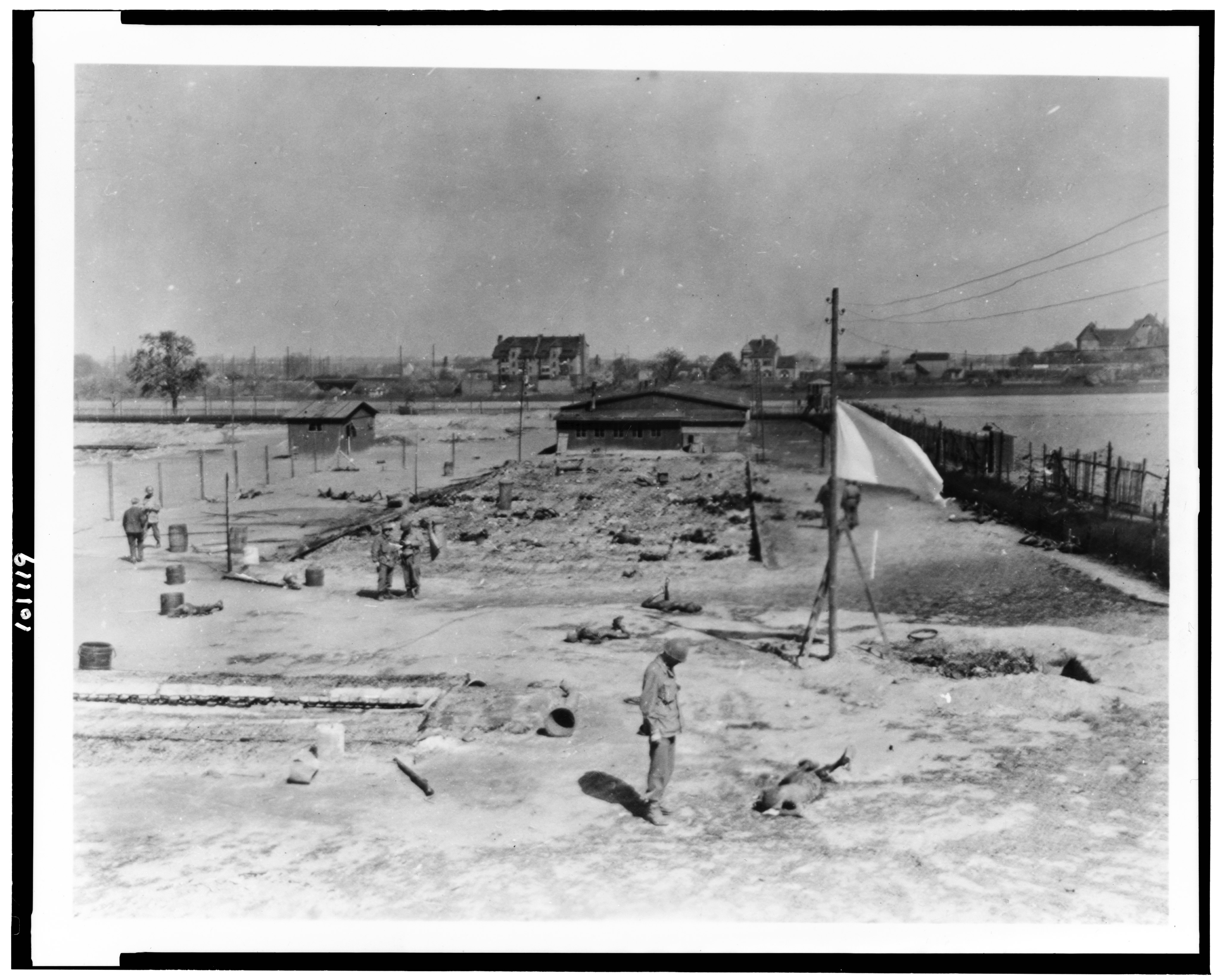
Abtnaundorf massacre site a day later, 1945

- 1945
  - 17 February: 600 prisoners brought to the Leipzig-Thekla subcamp from a subcamp of the Gross-Rosen concentration camp in Jasień.
  - 13 April: Leipzig-Thekla, Leipzig-Schönau and both HASAG subcamps dissolved. Most prisoners sent on death marches.
  - 18 April: Abtnaundorf massacre. Prisoners of the Leipzig-Thekla subcamp who were ill or unable to march, mostly Poles and Soviets, were massacred by the Gestapo, SS, Volkssturm and German civilians. Some prisoners were saved by Polish prisoners of another camp.
  - 19 April: City captured by American troops. The Capa House is the place of The Picture of the Last Man to Die.
  - July: City under Soviet control.
  - Population: 584,593.
- 1948
  - First exhibition on the Agra site.
- 1950
  - International Johann Sebastian Bach Competition begins.
  - Bach-Archiv founded.
  - Population: 617,574.
- 1951 - Erich Uhlich becomes mayor.
- 1953 - Theaterhochschule Leipzig established, later named after Hans Otto
- 1954
  - Staatsarchiv Leipzig (archives) founded.
  - Zentralstadion built.
- 1955

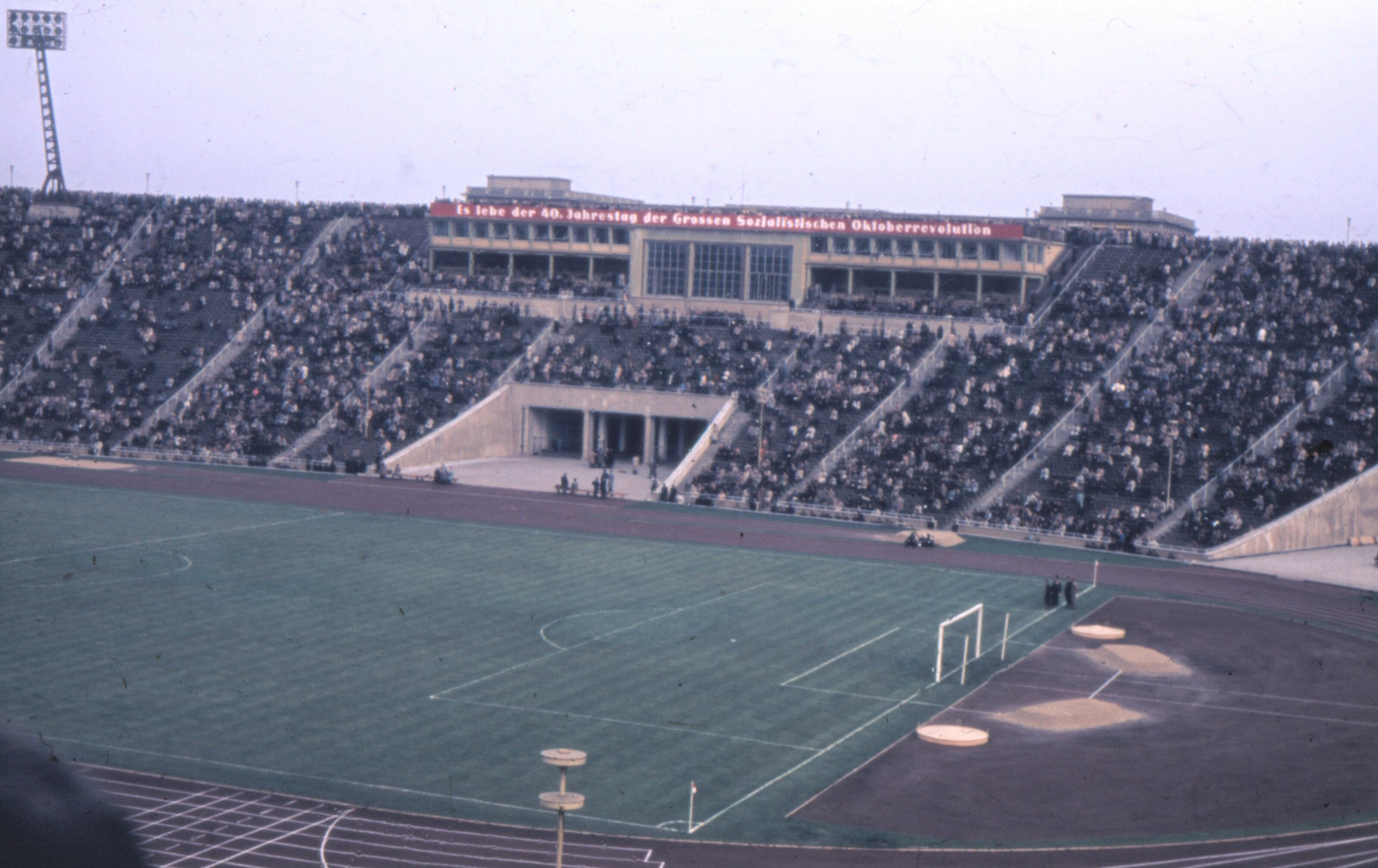
Match GDR - Czechoslovakia in the Leipzig Zentralstadion 1957

  - 1 May: Several historic parks united in the Kulturpark Clara Zetkin.
  - Festival of Cultural and Documentary Films begins.
- 1956 - Zentralstadion opens.
- 1959 - Walter Kresse becomes mayor.
- 1960
  - Opera house built.
  - Chess Olympiad held.
  - Population: 589,632.
- 1965
  - 31 October: Leipzig Beat Revolt on Wilhelm-Leuschner-Platz.
- 1968
  - 30 May: Paulinerkirche dynamited.
- 1969
  - 6 February: Polish Institute founded.
  - Leipzig-Halle S-Bahn established.
- 1970 - Karl-Heinz Müller (politician) becomes mayor.

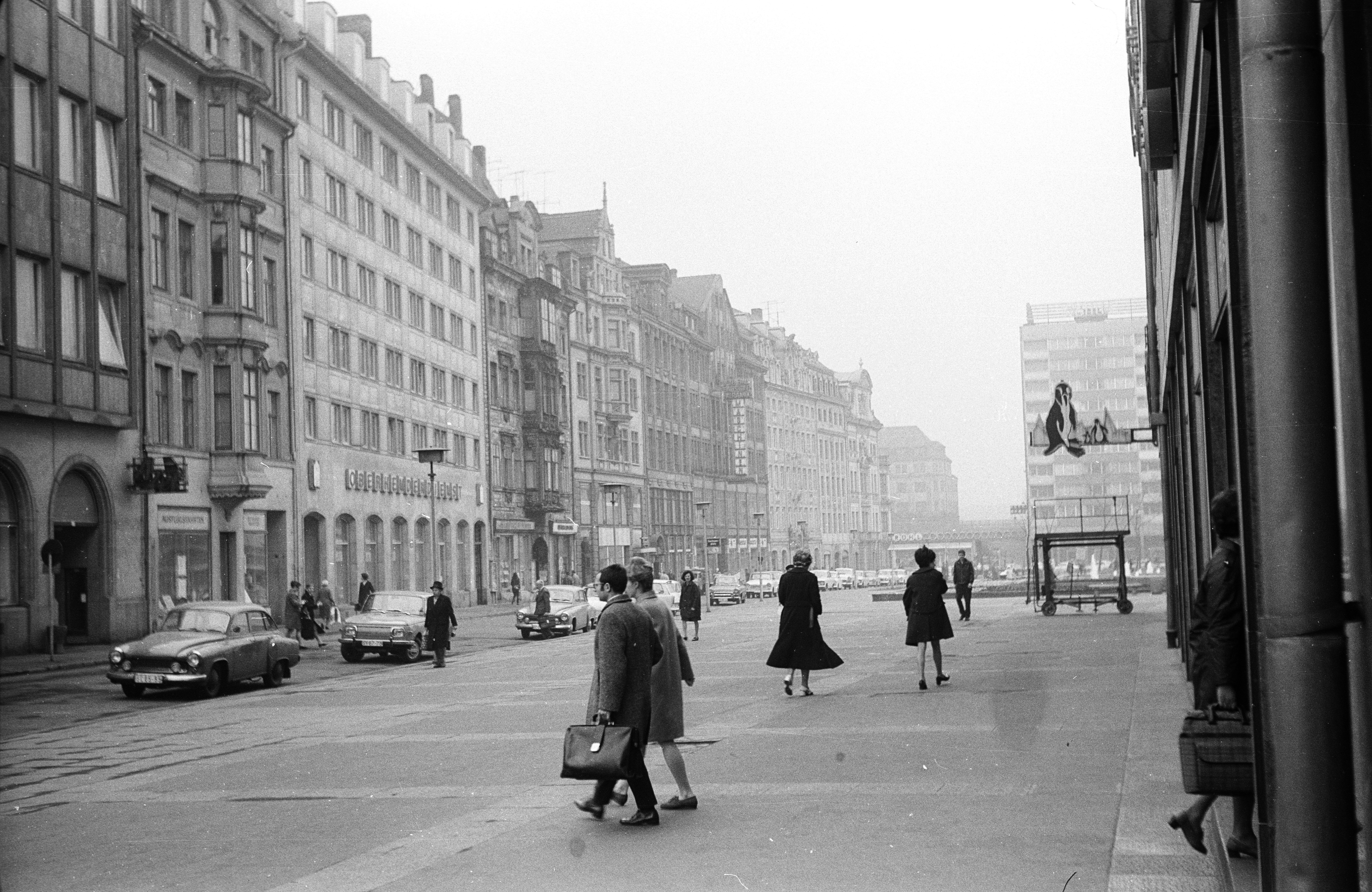
Leipzig in 1971

- 1972
  - Polish Consulate reopened.
  - City-Hochhaus Leipzig built.
  - Wintergartenhochhaus completed.
- 1974 - Moritzbastei rebuilt.
- 1976 - Construction of Grünau begins.
- 1977 - Sportmuseum founded.
- 1981 - 13 March: Hotel Merkur opened.
- 1983 - Bust of Richard Wagner erected.
- 1988
  - 5 June: "Pleiße Memorial March" (Pleiße-Gedenkmarsch) of oppositional environmental groups with 120 to 140 participants, which the Stasi tried in vain to prevent.
  - Memorial to Jewish Citizens erected.
- 1989 - Monday demonstrations.
- 1990
  - Neuer Leipziger Kunstverein (art association) founded.
  - Hinrich Lehmann-Grube becomes mayor.
- 1991

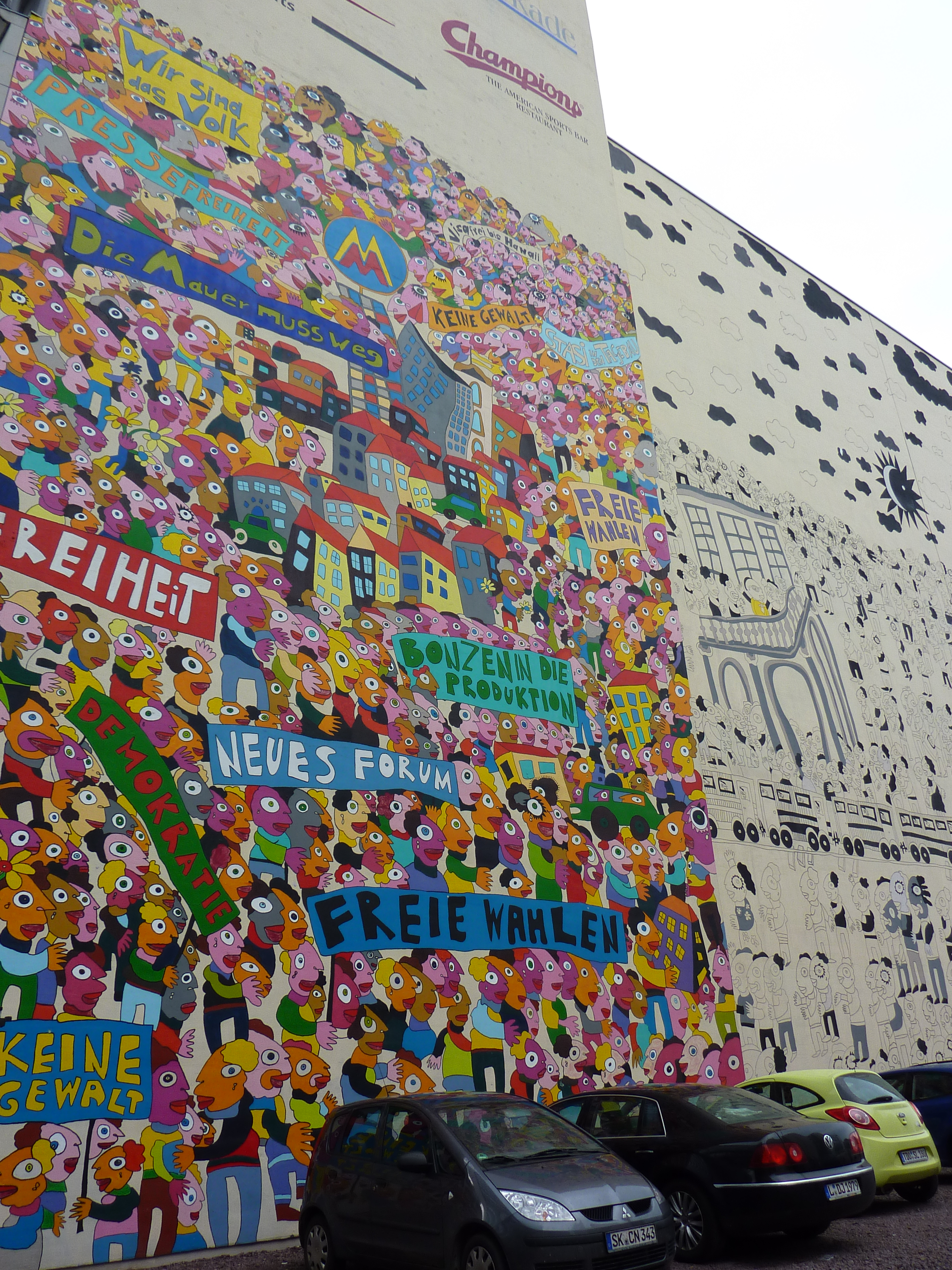
The 1989 demonstrations in a mural of Michael Fischer-Art (2013)

  - Euro-scene Leipzig theatre festival begins.
  - Mendelssohn House, Leipzig opens.
- 1992
  - Technischen Hochschule founded.
  - Wave-Gotik-Treffen begins.
  - Leipzig-Altenburg Airport opens.
  - American Consulate reopened.
- 1993 - Hartmannsdorf becomes part of city.
- 1994 - Museum of Antiquities of the University of Leipzig opens.
- 1995
  - Lausen and Plaussig become part of city.
  - Population: 471,409.
- 1996
  - New site of Leipzig Trade Fair opens.
  - Saxonia International Balloon Fiesta begins.
- 1997
  - Gottscheina, Hohenheida, and Seehausen become part of city.
  - Leipziger Versorgungs- und Verkehrsgesellschaft (city utility company) established.
  - Federal Administrative Court of Germany headquartered in Leipzig.
- 1998
  - 16 May: Galerie für Zeitgenössische Kunst in own building opened.
  - Podelwitz-Süd becomes part of city.
  - Wolfgang Tiefensee becomes mayor.
- 1999
  - Böhlitz-Ehrenberg, Engelsdorf, Holzhausen, Liebertwolkwitz, Lindenthal, Miltitz and Mölkau become part of city.
  - 20 March: Grünauer Welle opened.
  - Column in the St. Nicholas Church Square erected as memorial to the Peaceful Revolution ten years ago.

== 21st century ==
- 2000 - Burghausen und Rückmarsdorf become part of city.
- 2002
  - Arena Leipzig built.
  - Games Convention begins.
- 2004
  - Leipziger Internet Zeitung begins publication.
  - Museum der bildenden Künste opens in new building.
  - Leipzig Botanical Garden renovated.
  - Leipzig is the German candidate city for the 2012 Summer Olympics
- 2005
  - Art galleries open in Leipziger Baumwollspinnerei.
  - BMW Central Building constructed.
  - City hosts the 2005 World Fencing Championships.
  - Population: 502,651.

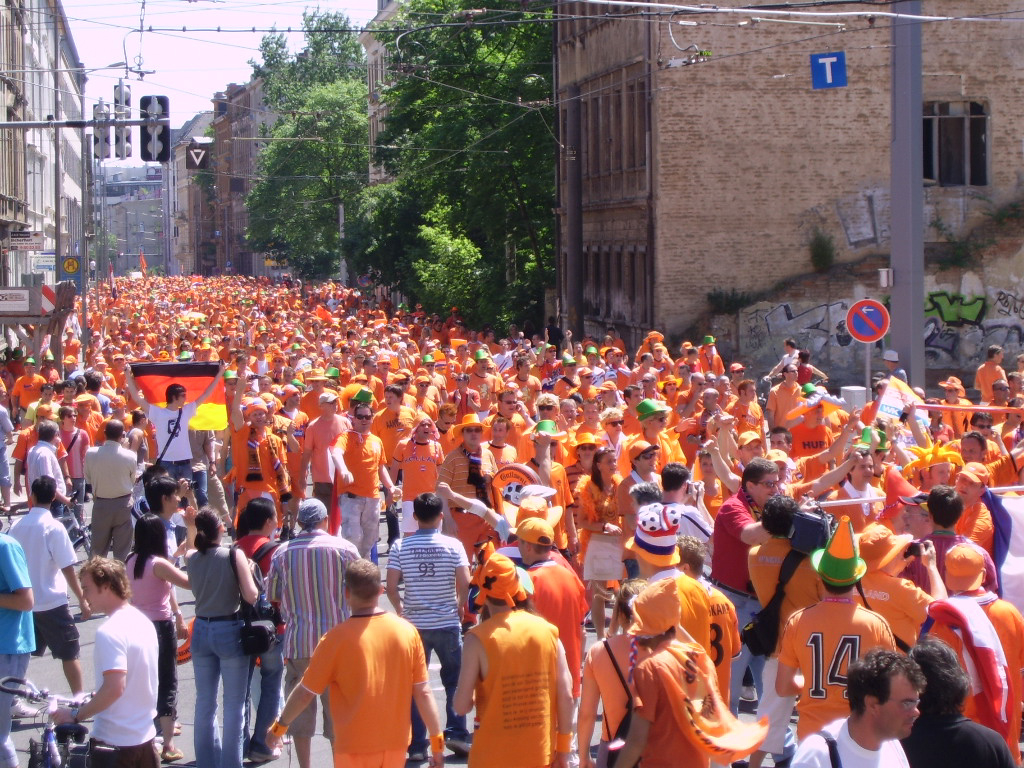
Oranje supporters at the 2006 FIFA World Cup in Leipzig

- 2006
  - Amazon.com distribution centre begins operating.
  - Burkhard Jung becomes mayor.
  - Leipzig hosts 2006 FIFA World Cup. Replacement of the Zentralstadion (1956) by a new stadium, since 2010 named Red Bull Arena (Leipzig).
- 2007
  - Paulinum reconstruction begins.
  - July: City hosts the 2007 World Archery Championships.
- 2010
  - Haus der Computerspiele (museum) active.
  - German Music Archive relocates to Leipzig.
- 2012
  - 25 September: Höfe am Brühl opened.
  - German organ donor scandal reported.
- 2013
  - 22 May: Inauguration of Richard Wagner Memorial.
  - New Propsteikirche begins construction.
  - Leipzig City Tunnel opened.
  - Leipzig is the most livable German city.
- 2014 - Population: 551,871.

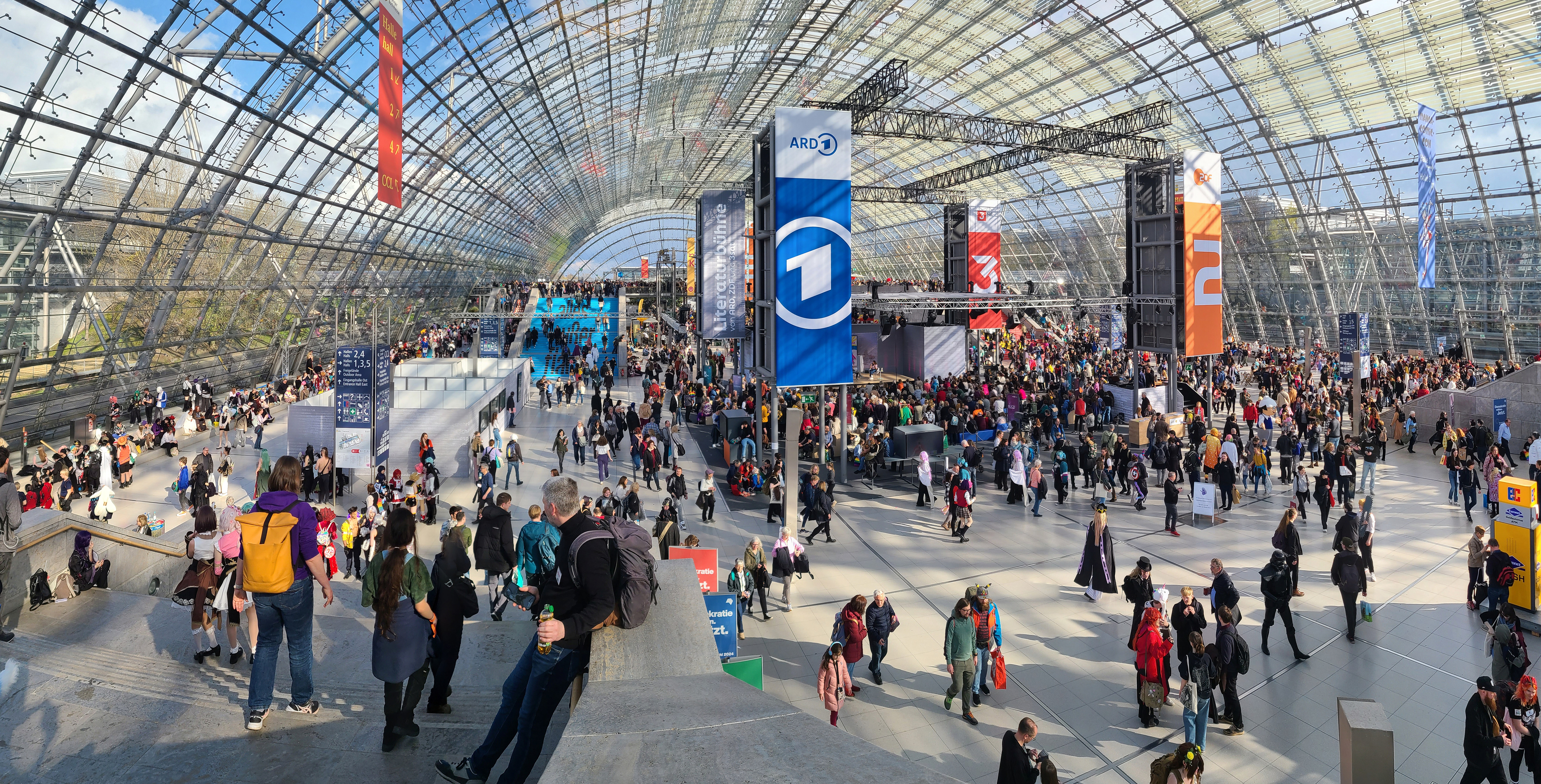
Leipzig Book Fair 2024

- 2015
  - 12 January: Demonstration of the Leipzig branch of Pegida and counterdemonstration with much more participants.
  - Erfurt–Leipzig/Halle high-speed railway opened.
- 2017
  - 9 January: Last demonstration of the Leipzig branch of Pegida, only 400 participants.
  - July: City hosts the 2017 World Fencing Championships.
  - 3 December: Paulinum opening.
  - December: City co-hosts the 2017 World Women's Handball Championship.
  - Population: 590.337
- 2018 - Leipzig wins the European Cities of Future prize in the category of "Best Large City for Human Capital & Lifestyle"
- 2019 - Leipzig is European City of the Year
- 2020 - 7 November: Rally against anti-pandemic regulations, organized by Querdenken.
- 2021 - Parties in the expiring corona lockdown at the Sachsenbrücke.
- 2022
  - Green bike lanes pigmented on several sections of the Inner City Ring Road.
  - Population: 624.689
- 2024
  - 21 January: Demonstration of estimated 60.000 participants in the 2024 German anti-extremism protests in Leipzig.
  - Leipzig is UEFA Euro 2024 host city.

== See also ==
- History of Leipzig
- List of mayors of Leipzig
- History of the Jews in Leipzig
- Architecture of Leipzig

Other cities in the state of Saxony:

- Timeline of Chemnitz
- Timeline of Dresden

== Bibliography ==
=== in English ===
- Richard Brookes (1786), "Leipsick", The General Gazetteer (6th ed.), London: J.F.C. Rivington
- Abraham Rees (1819), "Leipsick", The Cyclopaedia, London: Longman, Hurst, Rees, Orme & Brown, hdl:2027/mdp.39015068382327
- Muirhead, James Fullarton (1882). "Leipsic" . Encyclopædia Britannica. Vol. 14 (9th ed.). pp. 429–431.
- "Leipzig". Handbook for North Germany. Murray's hand-book Rhine & North Germany. London: J. Murray. 1886. hdl:2027/hvd.hn1imr.
- George Bradshaw (1898), "Leipsic", Bradshaw's Illustrated Hand-book to Germany, London: Adams & Sons
- "Leipzig". Chambers's Encyclopaedia. London: W. & R. Chambers, Limited; J.B. Lippincott Company. 1901. hdl:2027/uc2.ark:/13960/t7zk5ms79.
- "Leipzig", Northern Germany (15th ed.), Leipzig: Karl Baedeker, 1910, OCLC 78390379 + 1873 ed.
- "Leipzig" . Encyclopædia Britannica. Vol. 16 (11th ed.). 1910. pp. 399–402.
- Benjamin Vincent (1910), "Leipsic", Haydn's Dictionary of Dates (25th ed.), London: Ward, Lock & Co.

=== in German ===
- "Leipzig". Biblioteca geographica: Verzeichniss der seit der Mitte des vorigen Jahrhunderts bis zu Ende des Jahres 1856 in Deutschland (in German). Leipzig: Wilhelm Engelmann. 1858. (bibliography)
- F. Th. Richter, ed. (1863). Jahrbüchlein zur Geschichte Leipzigs (in German). Verlag Julius Klinkhardt. (includes city timeline)
- "Leipzig". Brockhaus' Konversations-Lexikon (in German) (14th ed.). Leipzig: Brockhaus. 1896. hdl:2027/njp.32101064064551.
- P. Krauss und E. Uetrecht, ed. (1913). "Leipzig". Meyers Deutscher Städteatlas [Meyer's Atlas of German Cities] (in German). Leipzig: Bibliographisches Institut.
- "Stadtgebiet und Witterung", Statistisches Jahrbuch 2015 (in German), Stadt Leipzig, "Chronologie der Eingemeindungen"
- "Bevölkerungsbestand", Statistisches Jahrbuch 2015 (in German), Stadt Leipzig, "Amtliche Bevölkerung, Fläche und Bevölkerungsdichte seit 1699"
- Wolfgang Adam; Siegrid Westphal, eds. (2012). "Leipzig". Handbuch kultureller Zentren der Frühen Neuzeit: Städte und Residenzen im alten deutschen Sprachraum (in German). De Gruyter. pp. 1253–1298. ISBN 978-3-11-029555-9.
