= Leipzig merchant bourgeoisie =

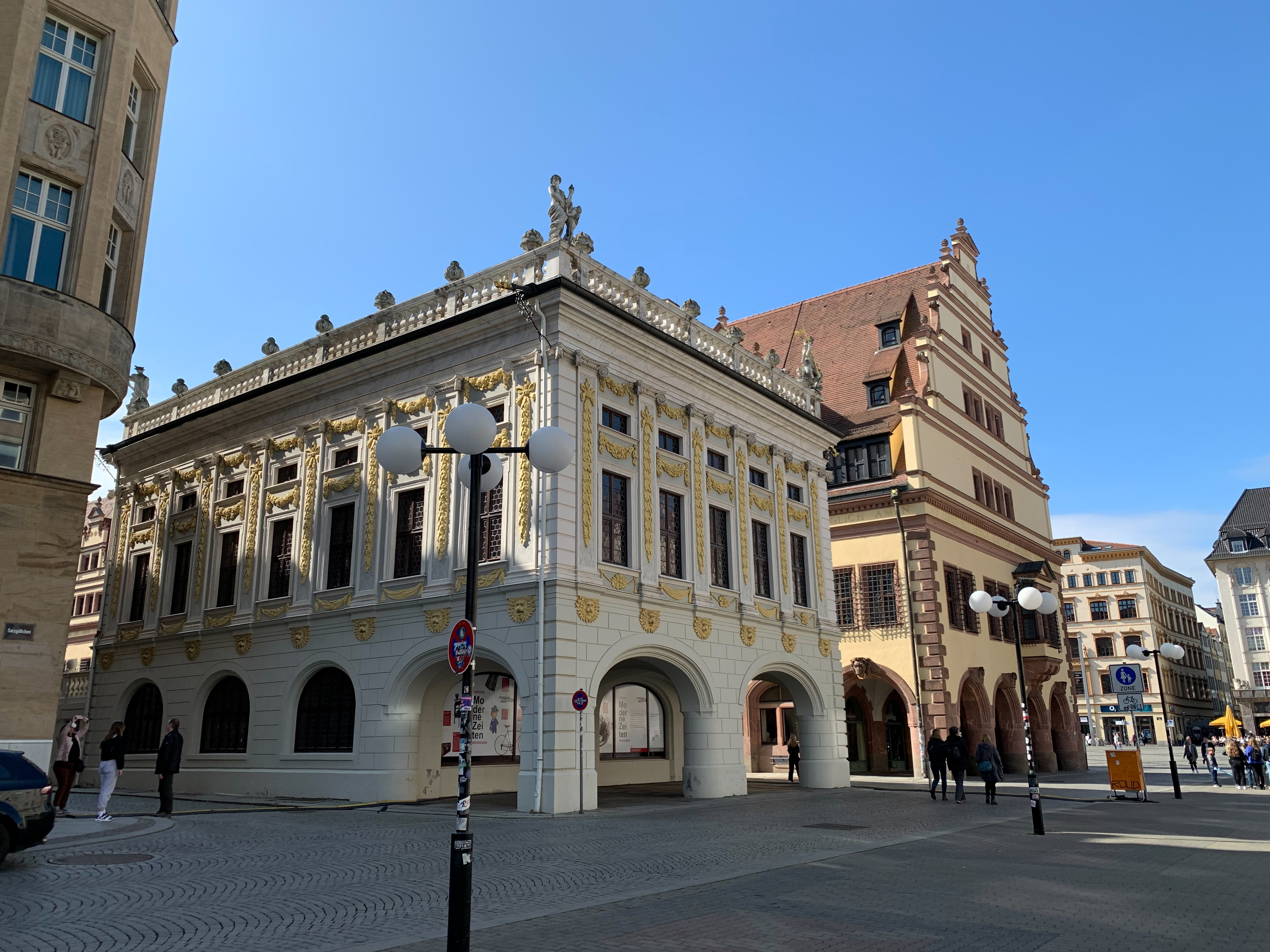
Leipzig Alte Handelsbörse (Old Stock Exchange) and Old Town Hall

The Leipzig merchant bourgeoisie (in German: Leipziger Handelsbürgertum) refers to a historical social subgroup of the bourgeoisie in Leipzig, Germany, that was formed from the urban patriciate in the Middle Ages and existed as a prominent social class from around the middle of the 16th century until its dissolution in 1945. The merchant bourgeoisie owed its rise to the city's location at the intersection of two important trade routes - Via Regia and Via Imperii - for long-distance trade and to the imperial trade fair privilege of 1497 (Reichsmesseprivileg), which elevated the city to the status of an imperial trade fair. The dissolution of the urban social class took place through overarching transformation processes with the aim of establishing a socialist society in East Germany.

== Groups ==
The Leipzig merchant bourgeoisie represented the largest group of the entire Leipzig upper class. These were merchants, manufacturers, banking families, publishers, and in a broader sense also large landowners. In addition, there was the elite of academic teachers, primarily professors, who belonged to the bourgeois upper class. Both groups were closely allied with the city councillors and the richest Leipzig families. The educated class of the entire bourgeois upper class also included the officials of the state administration, doctors, priests, officers, and schoolmasters. A mixing of the classes took place.

The class was highly cohesive and had strong family networks. As leading representatives of their social class in the Electorate of Saxony and the subsequent Kingdom of Saxony, they shaped and influenced almost all social and political fields of their time. As representatives of merchant capitalism and thus lobbyists for important Leipzig financial institutions such as the Leipzig Bank, trading establishments such as the Alte Handelsbörse (Old Stock Exchange) and later the New Stock Exchange, as well as industrial companies, they controlled the social and economic flows in the Saxon state to a large extent, both factually and informally. Thanks to their excellent international network, all of their activities also had an impact abroad. They also used their family networks across sectors.

== Trade, culture and art ==
The exemplary forms of action included, among others, investments, speculations, purchases, sales, aid, donations, patronage and other forms of social action that were typical for representatives of the upper class of Europe.

Civic institutions also included the press and the book industry. The shaping of public opinion was also within the sphere of influence of the Leipzig merchant bourgeoisie. This also includes the Leipzig Book Fair and the Leipzig book trade. The most important platform remained the Leipzig Trade Fair until the socialist upheaval after 1945.

The Leipzig merchant bourgeoisie was active in promoting art and culture, but above all with a focus on music. This led to the establishment of internationally important high culture institutions, which in turn attracted engagements from well-known music stars of their time. These included, for example, Johann Sebastian Bach, Georg Philipp Telemann, Felix Mendelssohn Bartholdy, Robert Schumann, Albert Lortzing, Gustav Mahler, who at least temporarily worked in the wealthy trade fair city. The patrons wanted to raise the reputation of their city. This form of behavior of financial generosity for the Leipzig community was taken for granted in the upper circles.

== History ==
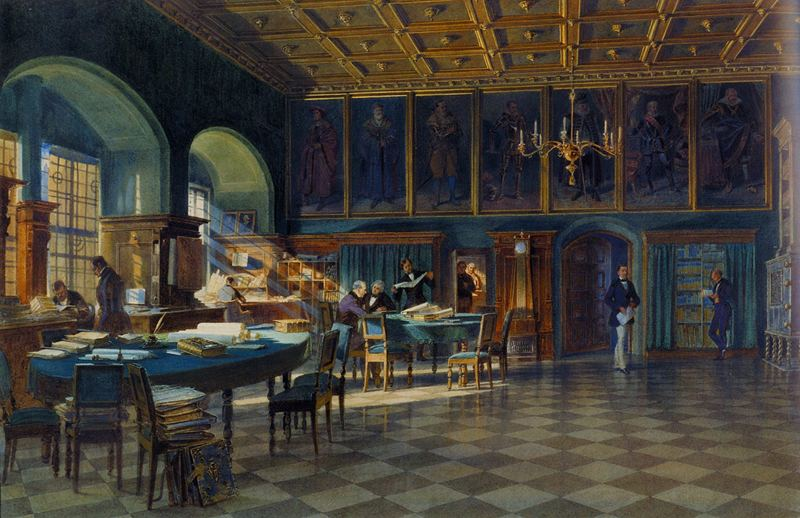
Carl Lampe in the council chamber of the Old Town Hall (sitting with Mayor Otto Koch at the round table in the background, around 1858)

Far from the Saxon royal court and princely tutelage, equipped with trade fair privileges, located at an internationally important crossroads of Via Regia and Via Imperii, the Leipzig merchant bourgeoisie grew up, which took advantage of this favorable starting point.

In the 16th century, Leipzig's merchant bourgeoisie made a decisive contribution to the development of productive forces in Saxony, especially in the field of textile production. Leipzig's merchants also made a profit by acquiring shares in mining in the Ore Mountains during the Berggeschrey.

The influences and effects on Saxony began in the Middle Ages and continued until the end of the existence of the Leipzig social class. Nikolaus Krell, chancellor at the end of the 16th century, tried to carry out a Calvinist revolution in Saxony but failed. His power base was limited to the trust of the Elector, a small group of Reformed preachers and a minority of intellectuals who - like the chancellor himself - mostly came from the Leipzig merchant bourgeoisie.

Saxony's most important ruler, Augustus II the Strong, found an important economic foundation for his ambitious political goals in the Leipzig merchant class. This created reliable partnerships by granting loans in Eastern Europe.

In 1678 the Alte Handelsbörse (Leipzig Stock Exchange) was founded. In 1699 the first bank in Leipzig and Saxony, the Banco di Depositi, was founded.

The basic features of the political interests were always the same. Trade should not be hindered by customs barriers or monopolies. Major merchants should have complete freedom in organizing their foreign trade. Trade agreements should ensure the free development of Saxon trade and enable the sales of Saxon products.

The Saxon upper middle class, whose economic development was hampered in the second quarter of the 18th century by financial mismanagement in the Brühl era, was unable to exert any significant political influence at that time. However, the crisis in Saxony after the Seven Years' War led to bourgeois forces from the circles of Saxon wholesalers and manufacturing entrepreneurs being called upon to help shape Saxony's future politics and economic management. The Restoration Commission, headed by Privy Councillor Thomas von Fritsch, who had come from the Leipzig merchant bourgeoisie, was commissioned to draw up reform plans.

The founding of the Leipziger Ökonomische Sozietät (Leipzig Economic Society) took place during the years of the Electorate of Saxony's reestablishment. The initiator of this society was Peter von Hohenthal, who came from the Leipzig merchant bourgeoisie.

The Leipzig merchant bourgeoisie, whose trade depended on the Elector's favor, was hostile to the French Revolution.

Among others, Carl Lampe, Gustav Harkort, Gustav Moritz Clauß, Adolf Heinrich Schletter and Heinrich Brockhaus belonged to the Leipzig merchant bourgeoisie. Most of them were involved in one way or another in the beginning of the industrial revolution in the 1830s.

Leipzig's merchants invested primarily in the infrastructure sector. By building the Leipzig–Dresden railway, Leipzig's merchants had put their Magdeburg counterparts under pressure, who in turn developed a vital interest in a train connection to Leipzig. During the preparation and construction of the Leipzig-Hof railway, there was a much closer cooperation between the state and Leipzig's merchants.

== See also ==
- History of Leipzig
- Timeline of Leipzig
