= Scottish Church (Dresden) =

Demolished church in Dresden, Germany

Coordinates: 51.039599°N 13.729970°E

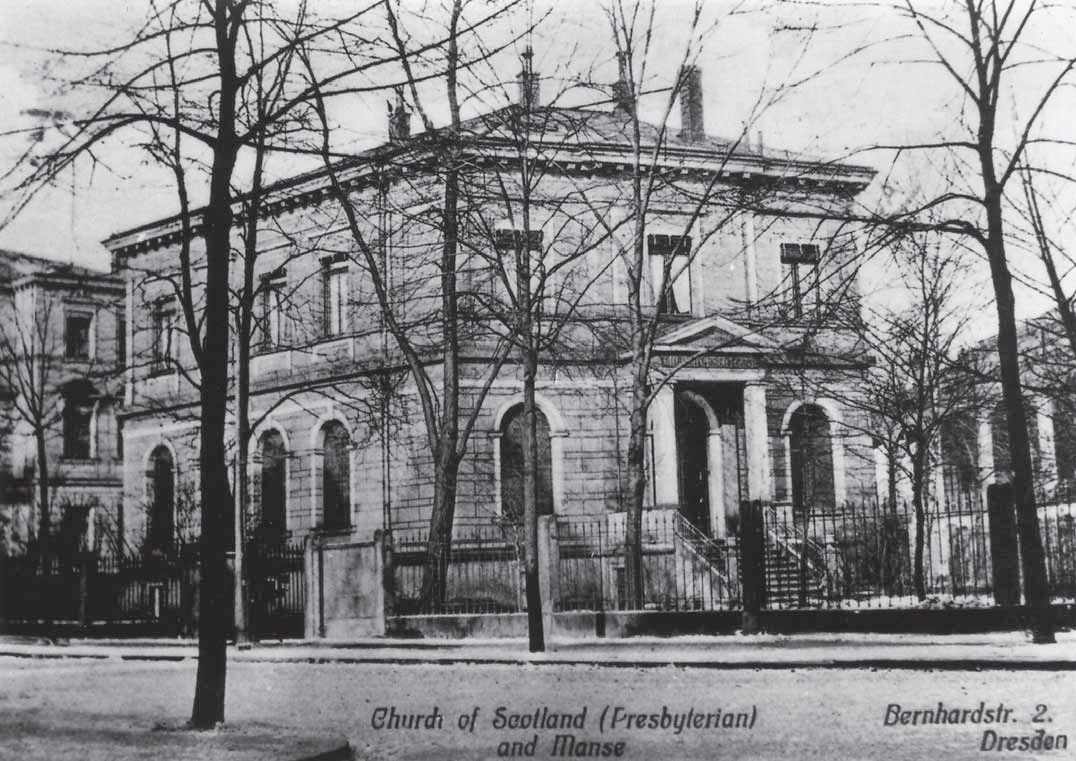
Scottish Church around 1900

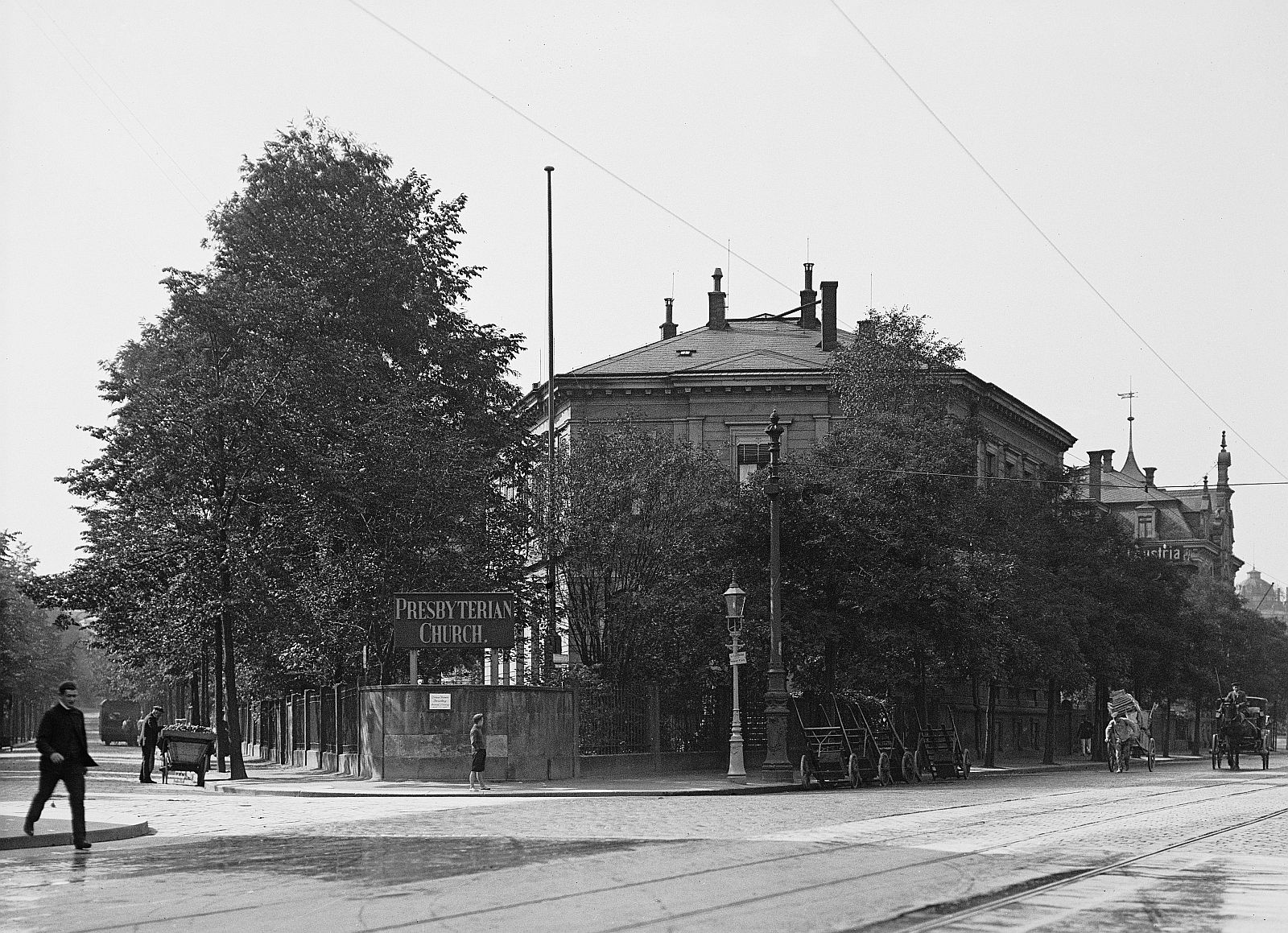
View around 1910

The Scottish Presbyterian Church was a villa-like church building in Dresden, located behind the south side of Dresden Central Station on 2 Bernhardstraße.

== History and architecture ==
The economic boom of the founding years led to the emergence of larger foreign communities in Dresden. After the Orthodox Russians (St. Simeon), the Anglican English (All Saints' Church) and the Episcopal Americans (St. John's Church), the Presbyterians living in Dresden also built their own church building in 1884. The Neo-Renaissance-style building stood behind the south side of the Bohemian Railway Station (since the 1890s: Central Station). Until then, a prayer room at Seestraße 10 had been used.

The architectural style suggests the influence of Gottfried Semper. It was a two-storey sandstone building in the style of Dresden villas. The ground floor and upper floor had well-structured window axes, the gable roof was flat, and there was no tower. The ground floor, clad in marble and oak panelling, had arched windows with Christian symbols. The main room, the community hall, offered 200 seats for worship and prayer. On the entrance side, there was a generously designed porch resting on two columns. An equally elegant open staircase led to the garden park on the side. The upper floor was also richly decorated with oak panelling and ornamental stucco mouldings. The wooden roof structure was covered with slate shingles.

With the outbreak of the First World War, many members of the congregation left Germany. The congregation, which continued to exist formally, rented the building to the Adventist Church, founded at the turn of the century, from 1915 onwards. Destroyed and burned out during the bombing of Dresden in February 1945, the ruins were cleared and removed around 1953.

== Literature ==
- Freiesleben, Hans-Jochen (2018). The Scottish Church (PDF) (3rd, revised ed.). Dresden, Lost Churches: Dresden's Destroyed Places of Worship. A Documentation since 1938 collection: City of Dresden. pp. 38–39.
- Paul Schumann (2014). Dresden (Reprint of the original edition from 1909 ed.). Dresden: Unikum-Verlag. pp. 274, 347. ISBN 978-3-8457-2138-5.
