= Elmar Peter Schwenke =

- Birth name: Elmar Peter Schwenke
- Born: 19 September 1958 (age 66); Leipzig, German Democratic Republic
- Occupation(s): Teacher, musician, composer
- Instrument: Keyboard
- Website: peterlemar.de (in German)

Elmar Peter Schwenke (born September 19, 1958; pseudonyms Peter Lemar and Erik Sanders) is a German educator, musician and writer.

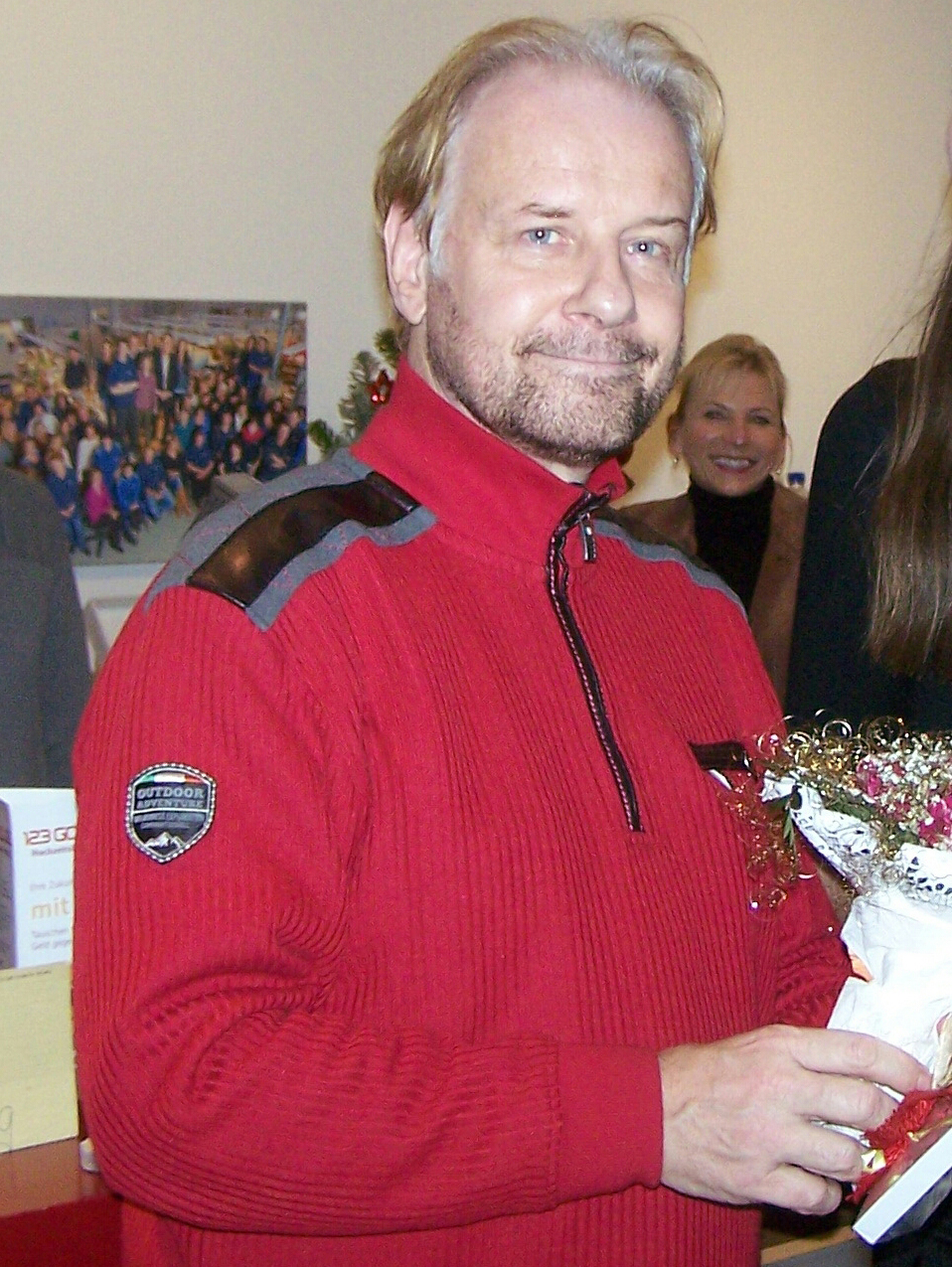
Elmar Peter Schwenke at a reading in the Trauringhaus Leipzig 2015

== Life ==
After high school, Schwenke served in the National People’s Army. From 1979 to 1983 he studied at the Leipzig University and graduated with a degree in music education. During his time as a teacher, he played keyboard in the band Logo, who had a number one hit on the Radio GDR Tipparade. In 1987 he left the band and changed to the band Zebra, who was known for adaptation of Brecht/ Weill-Songs (for example The Threepenny Opera).

After the fall of the Berlin Wall and the collapse of the East German culture industry, he works as a furniture carrier, taxi driver and painter. From 1993 to 1998 he was a radio broadcasting producer (Radio Leipzig, Radio PSR) and also co-producer of the comedy show Sinnlos-Telefon.

In 2002 his short story book The Abstract Woman was published for the US and UK market, a mix of science fiction, fantasy and psychostory, which reminds much of Edgar Allan Poe and Franz Kafka, one year after the book was presented at the Leipzig Book Fair (Leipzig liest) under the German title Die abstrakte Frau.

Elmar Schwenke is co-founder of the MUSIFA Music School, the first music academy with a certified music education in central Germany, and since 2004 member of the Bee Gees-Coverband Jive Talkin’ – The Portrait Of The Bee Gees.

In 2014 his debut single Ein Teil von mir (A part of me) achieved a first success in the German Schlager charts (number 122). His album Ich such Dich (I’m Looking For You) reached number 27 on iTunes Top 200 Alternative Charts (Germany).

Elmar Schwenke is member of the Association of German Writers and lives as a freelance writer in Leipzig. On his website he has a blog about current affairs.

== Discography ==
=== Albums ===
- 2010: You Will Be Mine
- 2011: Time Goes By
- 2012: Ich Such Dich

=== Singles ===
- 2014: Ev’rybody’s Dancin’
- 2014: I will Remember
- 2014: Ein Teil von mir
