= August Pieper (architect) =

German architect (1844–1891)

August Pieper (1844 in Hannover – 29 April 1891, in Hamburg) was a German architect, active in Dresden, Cologne and Hamburg. His brother was the engineer Carl Pieper (1842–1901), who also lived and worked in Hamburg in the 1880s.

== Life ==
He studied at secondary school and the university in his birthplace, before studying at the Vienna University of Technology under Friedrich von Schmidt, through whose efforts Pieper moved to Dresden in 1867. There Pieper designed the Christuskirche in Freital-Deuben, then All Saints Church and several villas on the city's Goethestraße (now Gret-Palucca-Straße). In 1873 he moved to Cologne and in 1879 to Hamburg.

== Works ==
- 1867: Draft design of the Christuskirche in Freital-Deuben
- 1868–1869: All Saints Church, Dresden
- 1869–1870: Villa Goethestraße 12 in Dresden
- 1869–1870: Villa Goethestraße 13 in Dresden
- 1872: Design entered into the competition for the Niederwalddenkmal (won first prize, but never built)
- 1886–1888: Portals into the Neuen Elbbrücke in Hamburg (with the architect Wilhelm Hauers and the engineer Franz Andreas Meyer)
