= Timotheus Ritzsch =

German printer, bookseller and publisher (1614–1678)

- Born: 24 January 1614; Leipzig, Saxony, Holy Roman Empire
- Died: 1 February 1678 (aged 64); Leipzig, Saxony, Holy Roman Empire
- Occupations: Printer, bookseller
- Years active: 1638-1678
- Spouse: Sabina Hildebrand (b. 1638)

Timotheus Ritzsch (24 January 1614 - 1 February 1678) was a German printer, bookseller, and publisher of the newspaper, Einkommende Zeitungen.

== Biography ==
Ritzsch was born in Saxony to Gregor Ritzsch (1584–1643), a hymn writer and printer from Bohemia and nephew of Michael Lantzenberger. Timotheus studied under his father and went out a three year long journey, returning in 1636. Timotheus married Sabina Hildenbrand and acquired his father's printing press and produced his first document, an occasional pamphlet for the wedding of Michael Von Ryssel and Elizabeth Laube Rüssel. In the 1640s, he expanded his operations to publishing scientific works and news coverage of Thirty Years' War from April 1643 to 1644. On 1 July 1650, Timotheus released the Einkommende Zeitungen (Incoming Newspapers) one of the oldest daily newspapers. On 1 January 1660, he released the Leipzig's first political newspaper and the Einkommende Zeitungen was consistently published until 1918 when it was surpassed by the Leipziger Zeitung (Leipzig Newspaper). Timotheus died in 1678.
