= American Church of St. John =

Church in Dresden, Germany

Coordinates: 51°01′56″N 13°43′50″E

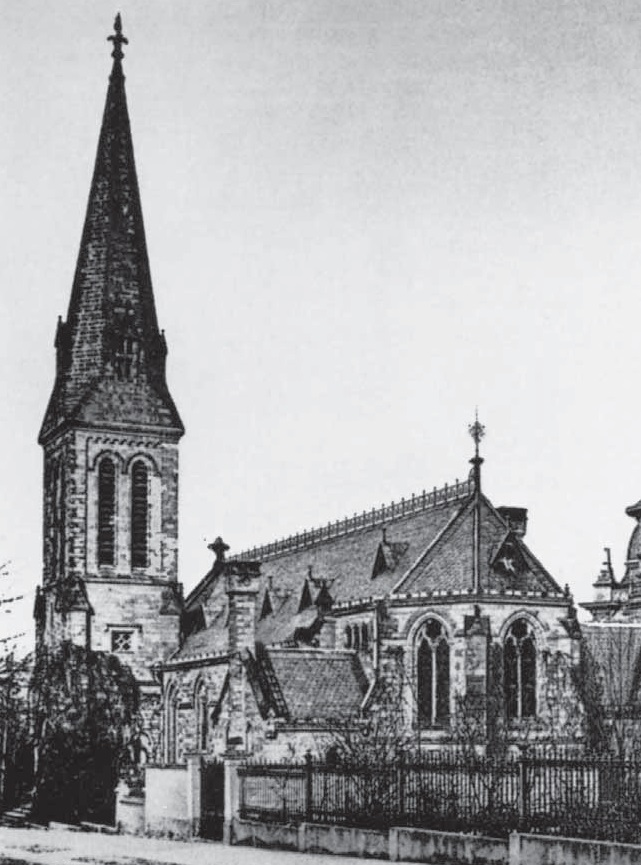
Church of St. John

The American Church of St. John was a church building constructed in Dresden for the expatriate American community in 1883 to 1884. It was damaged by bombing in 1945 and demolished in 1959.

== See also ==
- All Saints Church, Dresden
- All Saints Church, Leipzig
