= Paulinum (University of Leipzig) =

Building of University of Leipzig

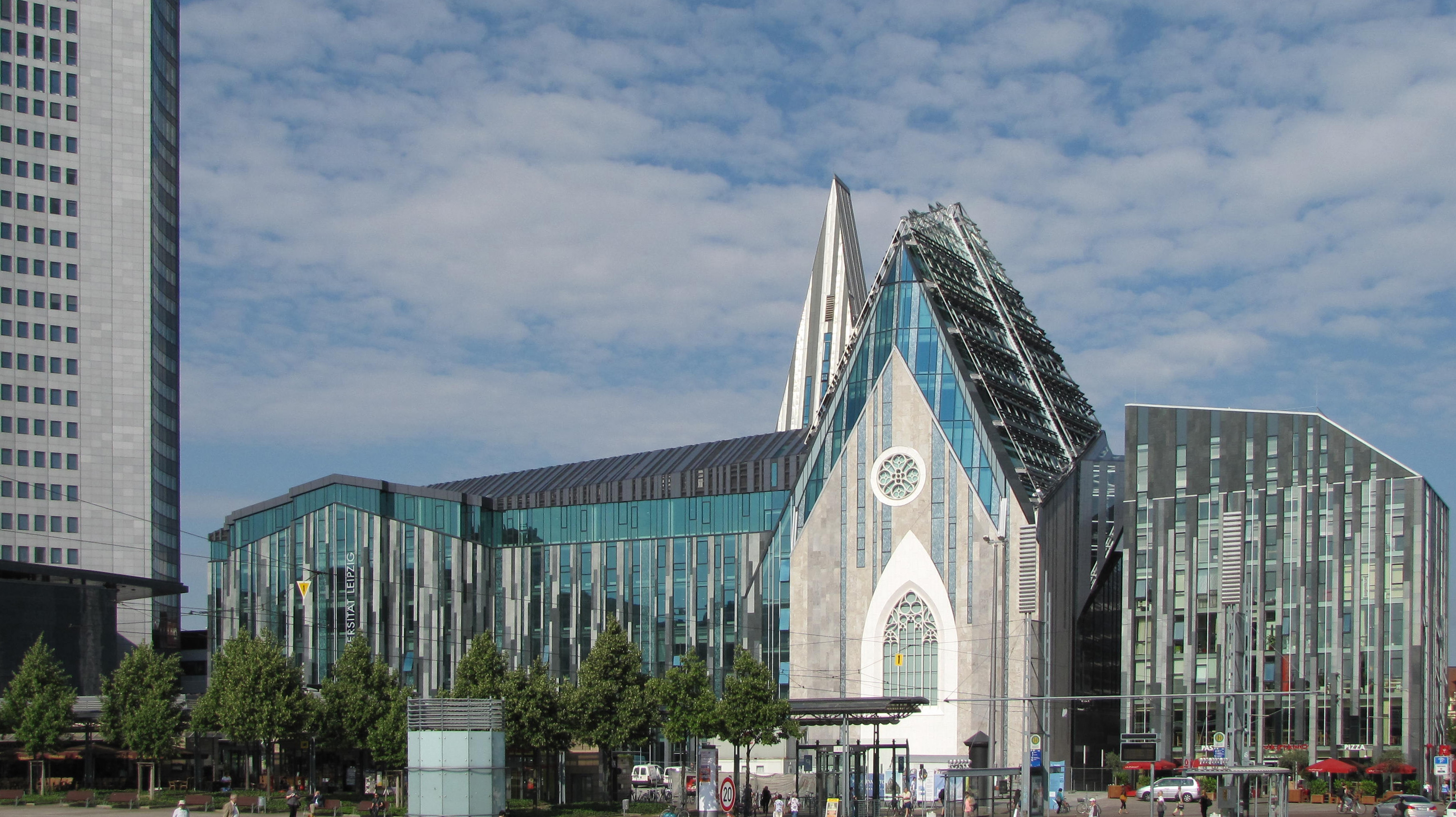
The new Paulinum of the University of Leipzig

Outside the Paulinum in December 2014

The Paulinum is a university building of University of Leipzig, whose construction began in 2007. Today's Paulinum stands at the site of the old university church, the Paulinerkirche, which was destroyed in 1968 during the communist regime of East Germany.

The building was designed by award-winning architect Erick van Egeraat. The Paulinum contains the university's assembly hall with an oratory, as well as rooms of the faculties for information science and mathematics. The assembly hall, which was erected on exactly the same site as the old university church, exhibits figures and other objects from Paulinerkirche and offers a room of common prayer. The University of Leipzig is one of the few German universities which retains the tradition of having its own university chapel, a tradition dating back for over 500 years. The facade of the Paulinum features collegiate Gothic architecture as a commemoration of the original building.

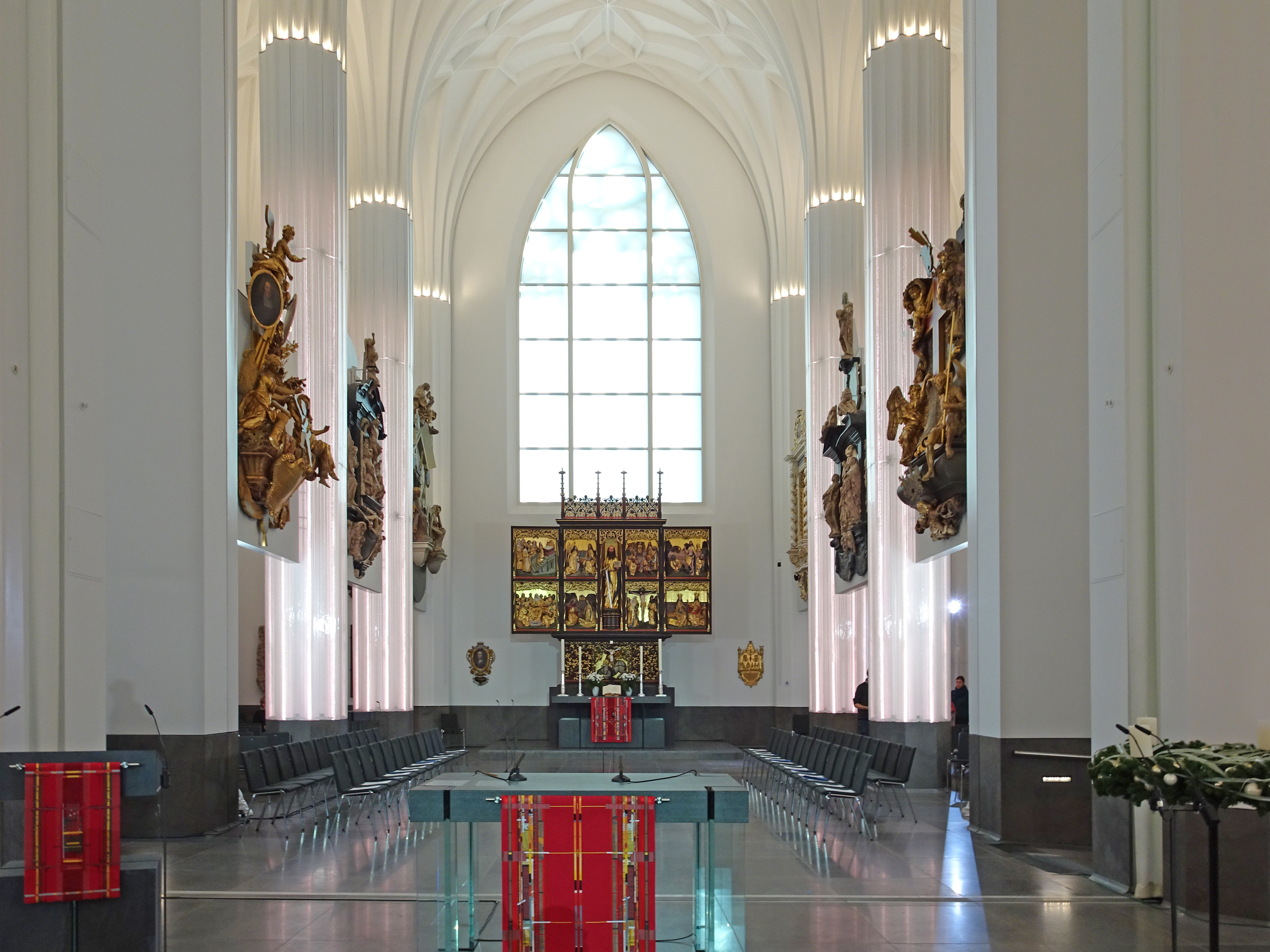
View of the prayer room (chapel choir) with historical figures and objects restored

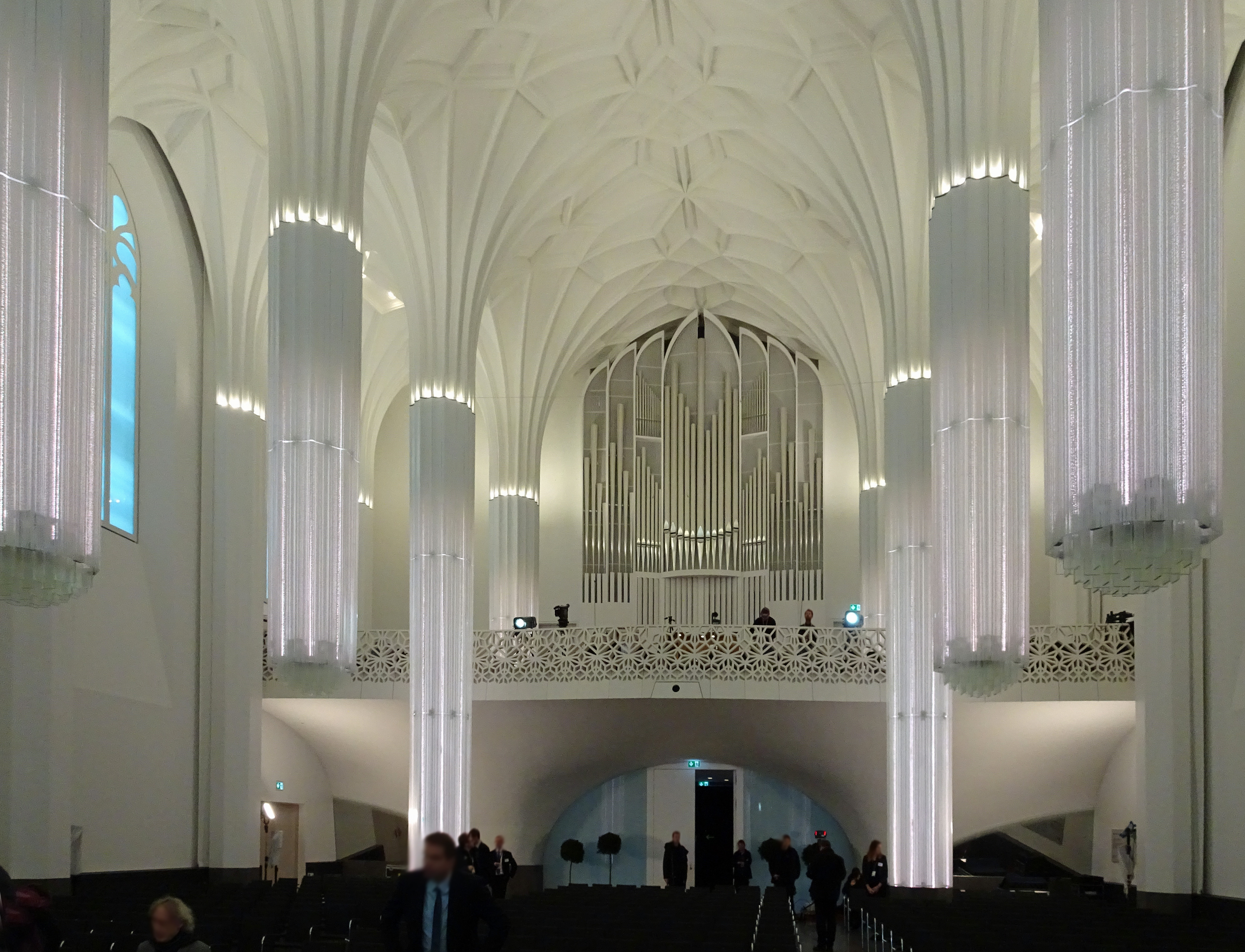
View from the chapel choir to the assembly hall. The two rooms can be separated or combined for different uses.

The name Paulinum derives from the old Collegium Paulinum (St. Paul's College) which was one of the old colleges at the University of Leipzig, which included the original university church.

== The Organ ==
Construction of the instrument was by Jehmlich Orgelbau Dresden (opus 1161) and was completed in 2017. The console consists of three manuals and a pedalboard. The 2951 pipes are in four divisions.
