= All Saints Church, Dresden =

All Saints' Church
- German: Allerheiligenkirche
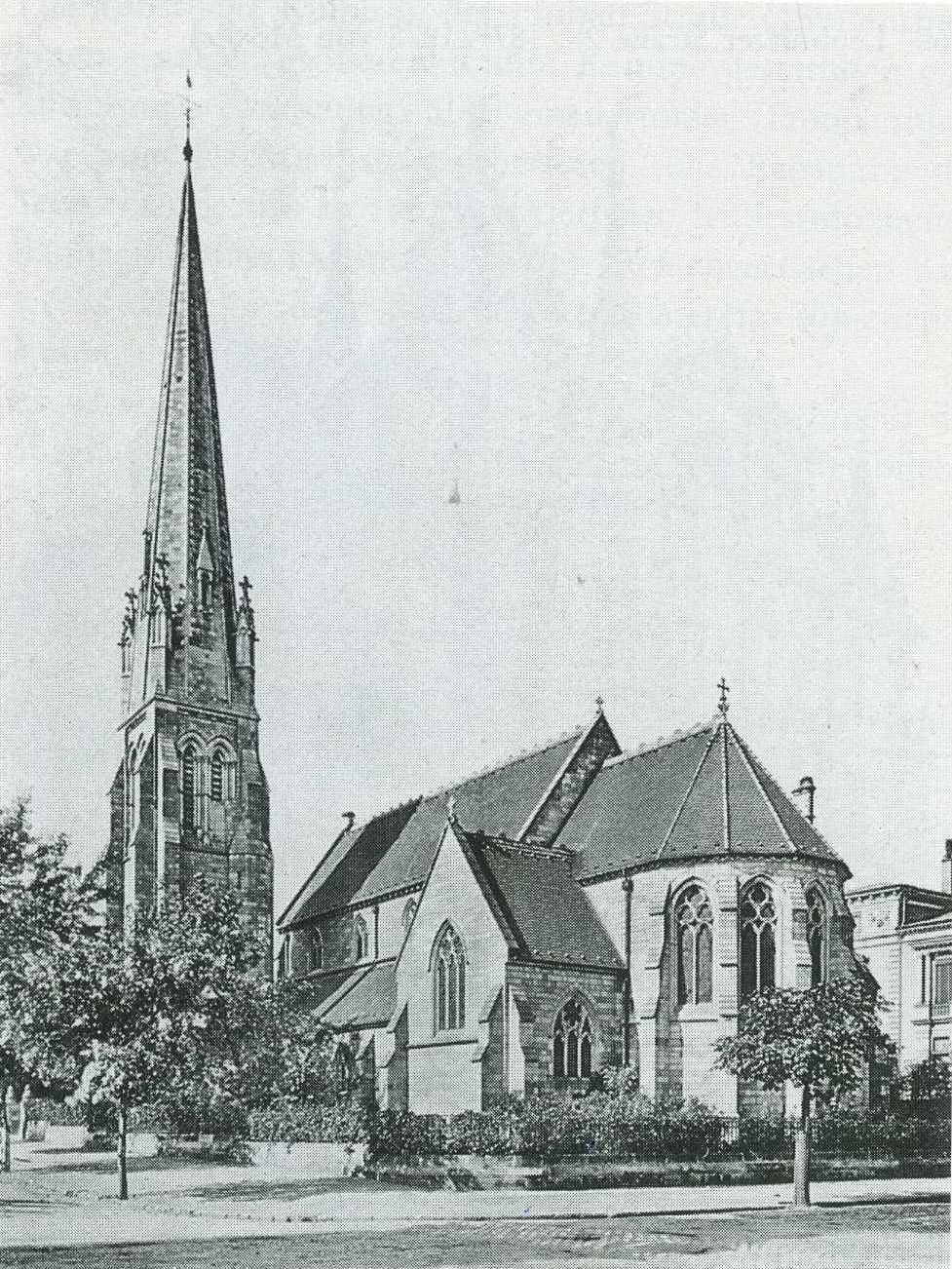
- The former Allerheiligenkirche in 1875
- All Saints' Church
- 51°02′18″N 13°44′22″E
- Address: Wiener Straße, Dresden
- Country: Germany
- Previous denomination: Anglican

History
- Status: Church (former)
- Founder: Wilhelm Heinrich Göschen
- Events: Dresden bombings

Architecture
- Functional status: Demolished
- Architects: August Pieper; James Piers St Aubyn
- Architectural type: Church (former)
- Style: Early English Gothic Revival
- Years built: 1868 – 1869
- Closed: February 1945
- Demolished: 1952

All Saints Church (German: Allerheiligenkirche) was an Anglican church on Wiener Straße in Dresden. It was in the Early English Period of Neo-Gothic architecture.

== History ==
The church was made possible by an endowment from the widow of Wilhelm Heinrich Göschen (William Henry Goschen), a merchant from Saxony living in London. It was built from 1868 to 1869 by August Pieper and the London architect James Piers St Aubyn for the many Anglicans living in Dresden. It was a small three-aisle basilica design, with a low choir and a polygonal apse. To its south was a square tower based on the Marburg Elisabethkirche with a tall octagonal spire. The roof was open on the inside and covered in sculpture. The church was only slightly damaged in the First World War but nevertheless fell out of use.

In 1927, a contractual agreement was reached between the All Saint's English episcopal church eV and the Evangelical-Lutheran St.-Pauls-Gemeinde to transfer the church for use by that congregation.

The church burned down in the Dresden bombings of 13 and 14 February 1945. The ruins were demolished in 1952.

== See also ==
- All Saints' Church, Leipzig
