= Bombing of Leipzig in World War II =

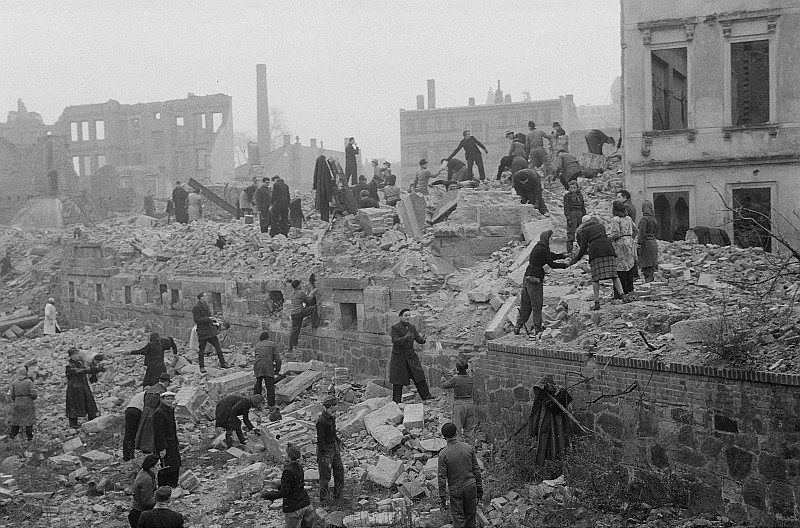
Leipzig in 1948

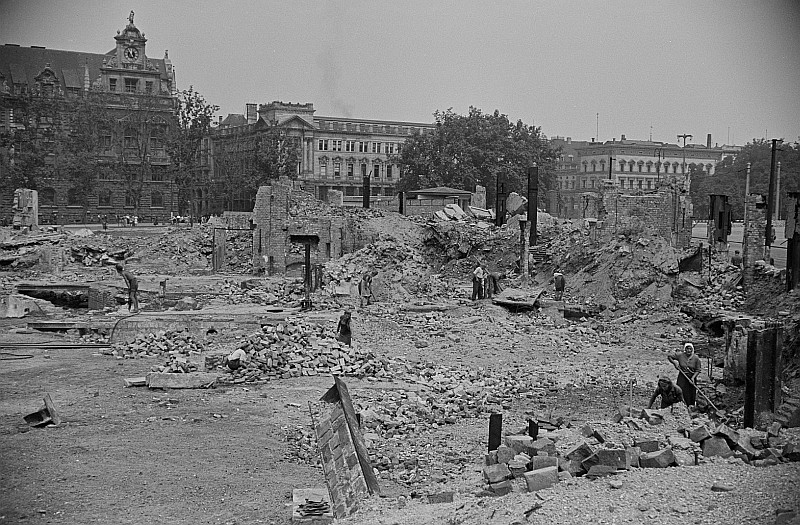
Leipzig in 1950

During World War II, Leipzig was repeatedly attacked by British as well as American air raids. The most severe attack was launched by the Royal Air Force in the early hours of 4 December 1943 and claimed more than 1,800 lives. Large parts of the city centre were destroyed, while factories experienced temporary shortfalls in production, had to move production facilities or even were decentralized.

At the outbreak of the war, Leipzig had more than 700,000 inhabitants and was therefore the sixth-largest city of the “Greater German Reich” (including Vienna). Leipzig additionally had significance by hosting the leading trade fair of the German Empire.

The Erla Maschinenwerk aircraft factory that produced Messerschmitt Bf 109 fighter planes at the three locations of Heiterblick, Abtnaundorf and Mockau were important for warfare.

Leipzig was also an important railroad intersection in Germany at that time.

== Attacks ==
=== First attacks ===
Prior to 1942, Leipzig had been considered relatively safe from potential aerial assaults because of the long flight route from Britain but after the attack on Kassel on 22–23 October 1943, it became clear that British bombers were able to reach central Germany.

On 27 March 1943, bombs were dropped by British aircraft setting Gohlis on fire. In the night of 31 August to 1 September, the British RAF Bomber Command carried out minor attacks on the towns of Eutritzsch and Schönefeld causing four casualties.

=== 4 December 1943 ===
During the night of 2 December 1943, the Royal Air Force once again attacked Berlin. Meanwhile, the German night fighters had prepared for these attacks and were able to shoot down 40 bombers. The following night, Leipzig was the target of an attack. The air route of this attack had been planned in a way to keep the German Air Defense in the dark about the attack's objective for as long as possible. Because the Germans did not expect an assault at this time, the Royal Air Force launched its attack in the early morning hours.

The route the bomber squadrons were following crossed over the continental coastline at the Zuiderzee, continued eastwards to Northern Germany and Berlin and turned southwards over the area of the city of Brandenburg. Between 3:50 AM and 4:25 AM, 442 bombers dropped a total amount of almost 1400 tons of explosives and fire bombs. At 3:39 AM, the air raid warning had been raised, with the all-clear following at 5:39 AM.

In the city centre, where the buildings were densely crowded, the air raid caused a firestorm. Hans Rumpf, the general inspector of fire fighting, happened to be in Leipzig during the attack. He said the firestorm was even more intense than the one in Hamburg during Operation Gomorrah.

Firefighters had to be called from the hinterland, as the fire brigade of Leipzig had had to send half of their own forces to Berlin. These external forces were often not able to fight the flames, because their hoses did not fit the custom-made connections to the hydrants in Leipzig, of which only 30% had been standardised. Moreover, the water supply broke down quickly.

More than 1800 people were killed in the attack. This is a small number for such a heavy attack, because many inhabitants did not follow the instruction to stay in the cellars until the all-clear was given, and so escaped the firestorm flames.

In the city centre many historical buildings fell victim to the attack, namely the Old and the New Theatre, the New Trade Exchange, the nave of St. John's Church (Johanniskirche, where the burial place of J.S. Bach was destroyed), the Alte Waage, St. Matthew’s Church (Matthäikirche), the Museum of Fine Art, the Café Zimmermann (a favourite place of Bach), and the Augusteum, the main building of the University. The roof truss of the Old Town Hall burned out; a concrete ceiling that had been installed at the beginning of the 20th century during a renovation prevented a burning out of the storeys below. As another consequence of the attack the destruction of 1,067 commercial buildings, 472 factory buildings, 56 schools, 29 fair buildings and 9 churches, among them the Anglican All Saints' Church, was recorded. Out of 92 departments of the University of Leipzig, 58 were hit and partially destroyed, including the first psychology laboratory, founded by Wilhelm Wundt.

=== 20 February 1944 ===
During the so-called Big Week, Leipzig was one of the first targets attacked by British and American bombers. On 20 February 1944, between 3:15 AM and 4:20 AM, residential areas in the south (Connewitz) and residential and industrial areas in the southwest of Leipzig (Schleußig and Großzschocher) were hit. During this night raid, more than 700 bombers were used, which dropped about 2300 tons of bombs. In the afternoon of the same day, more than 200 bombers of the 8th US Air Force attacked industrial facilities in the northeast of the city, using about 700 tons of bombs. The (second) Gewandhaus concert hall in the Musikviertel neighbourhood was almost totally destroyed as a result of the attacks.

In total, about 970 people died, most of them during the British night raid. During the following day raid some of the bombed factories were damaged severely, e.g. 65% of the "Erla Maschinenwerk" in Heiterblick was destroyed. In May 1944, its production had not entirely recovered yet, while the other bombed factories were working at full capacity again.

=== Later ===
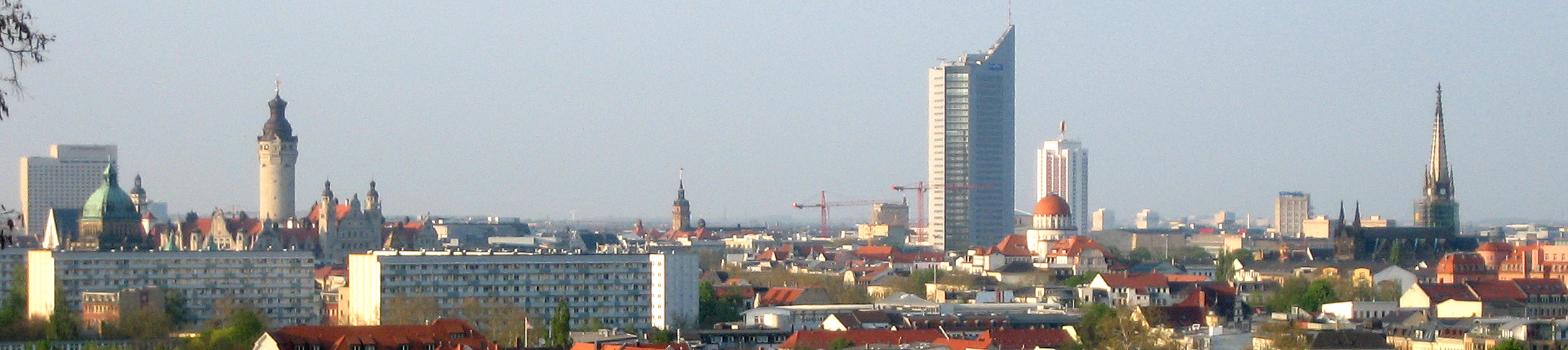
Leipzig skyline in 2007

In May 1944 more than 15,000 buildings were hit. Among them, more than 4,000 were destroyed completely, more than 1,000 heavily and over 10,000 slightly damaged. According to a preliminary official report from 30 December 1944, the regions which were mainly hit were the ring around the inner city, the directly adjacent areas to the west, north and east, as well as all the southern suburbs. The adjacent areas to the north and east were slightly affected, whereas no damage occurred in the outer west, southwest and northwest. About 140,000 people were left homeless.

On 23 February 1945 Leipzig received two major bombings: one by the British, and another by the Americans.

== Casualties ==
They buried the 3,474 victims of the bombings in today's XXVIII. Division of the city's Southern Cemetery.
