= All Saints' Church, Leipzig =

All Saints' Church
- German: Anglikanische Kirche or German: Anglo-Amerikanische Kirche
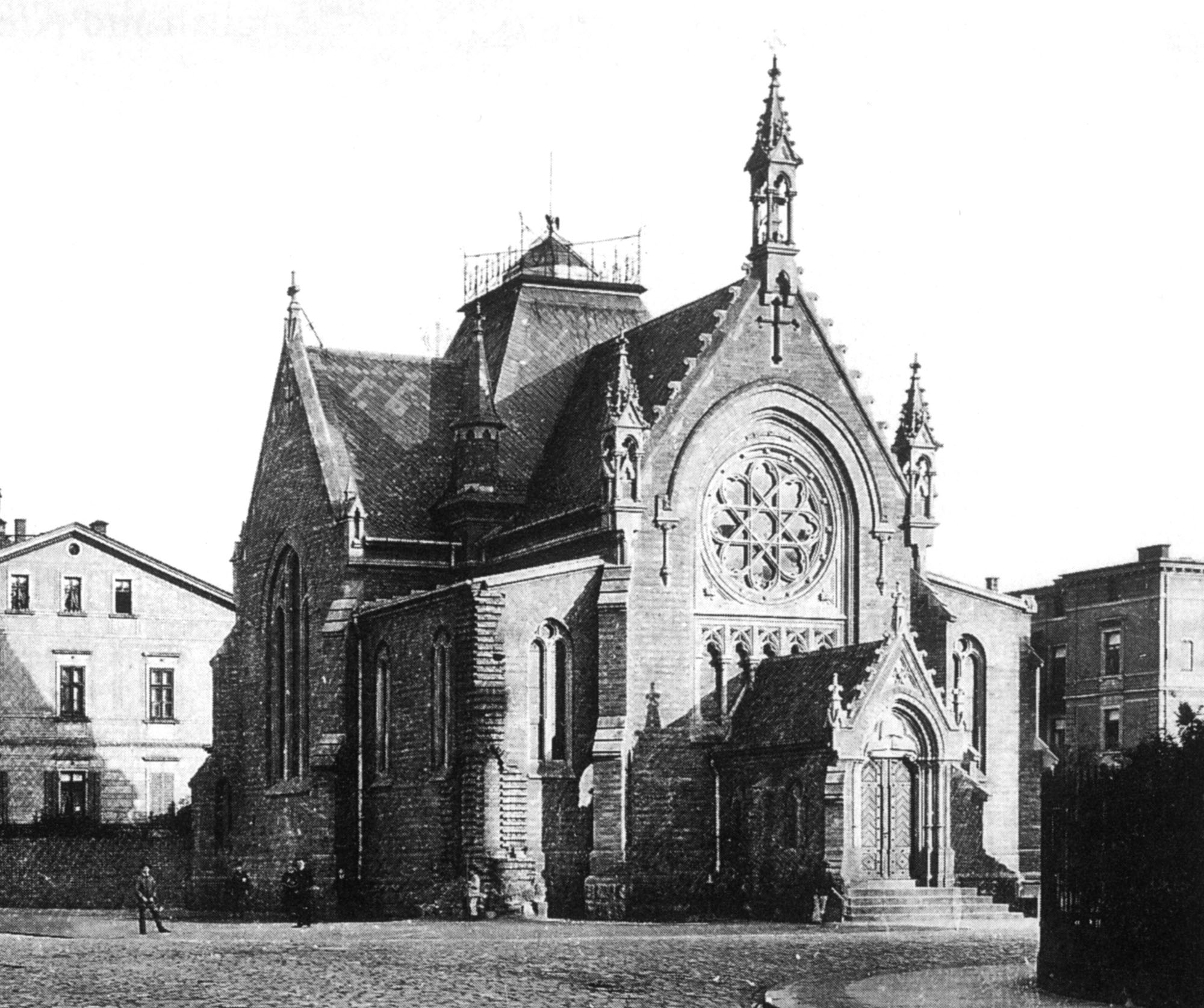
- All Saints Church in Leipzig, around 1900
- All Saints' Church
- 51°20′12.7″N 12°21′40.8″E
- Address: Sebastian-Bach-Strasse 1, 04109 Leipzig
- Country: Germany
- Previous denomination: Anglican

History
- Status: Church (former)
- Events: Leipzig bombings

Architecture
- Functional status: Demolished
- Architect: Oskar Mothes
- Architectural type: Church (former)
- Style: Early English Gothic Revival
- Years built: 1884 – 1885
- Closed: 4 December 1943
- Demolished: after 1945

The All Saints Church in Leipzig – also Church of the Ascension, All Saints' English and American Episcopal Church, Germanized Anglikanische Kirche and Anglo-Amerikanische Kirche – was an Anglican church building in the Bachviertel neighbourhood in the borough of Leipzig-Mitte.

== History of the church ==
=== Anglican community ===
In the 19th century, a large number of English and American artists, students and business people lived in the cultural and trade fair city of Leipzig. As a result, the first or regular Anglican services were held for the Anglo-American community as early as 1862/64. Initially, the Lutheran St. Thomas Church and the University of Music and Theatre in the Musikviertel neighbourhood were used for this purpose. To remedy this, the Saxon architect Oskar Mothes was commissioned to plan the construction of the church in 1870. His designs for the building project were used for the Anglican St. Luke's Church in the Bohemian town of Karlovy Vary, which was built between 1876 and 1877 (as a kind of "twin sister"), which may have delayed the start of construction in Leipzig. The consecration of the church in Bohemia took place on 24 June 1877.

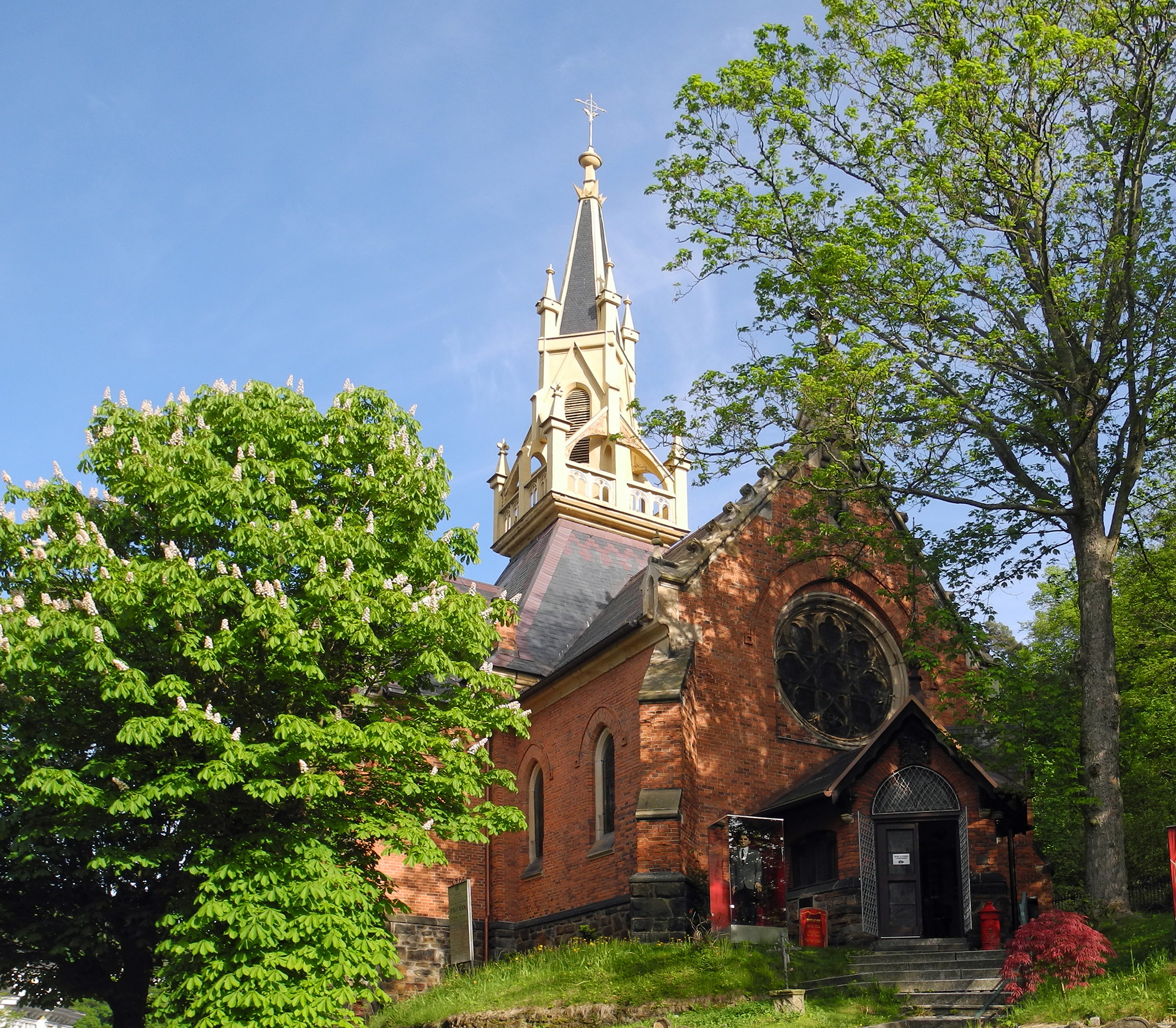
Twin sister: The Anglican St. Luke's Church in what was then Karlsbad (Boehmen)

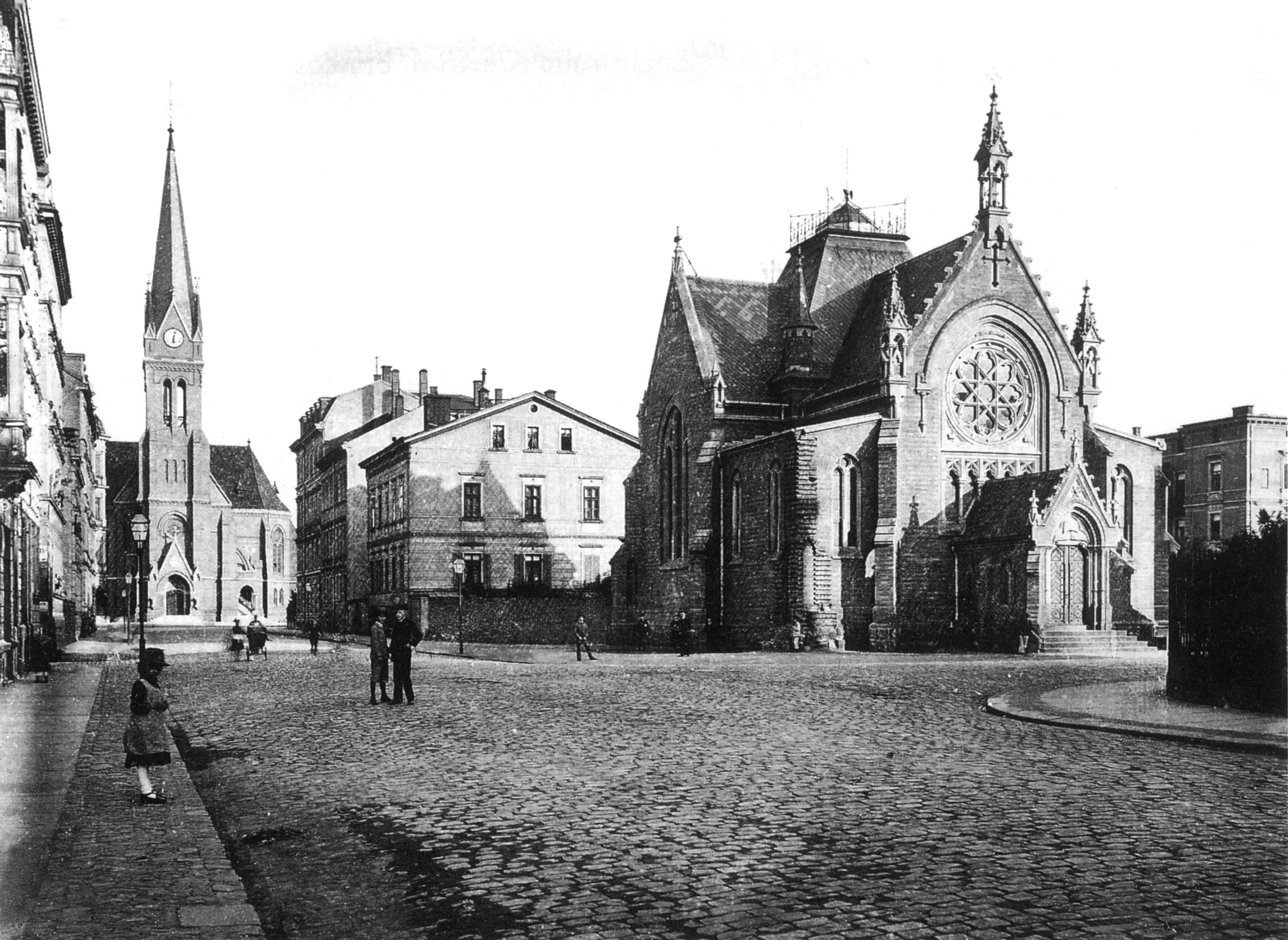
The church in Leipzig, Sebastian-Bach-Strasse 1 corner Schreberstrasse, view from the north-west, on the left the Luther Church on the site originally intended for the Anglican Church

In 1883, the city of Leipzig gave the Anglican community building land in Bismarckstrasse (later Ferdinand-Lassalle-Strasse) at the northwest end of Johannapark. However, due to the prestigious location, those responsible swapped the building site a short time later for the site of the nearby Luther Church, which had been built at the same time, on the corner of Sebastian-Bach-Strasse and Schreberstrasse. In May 1884, the ceremonial laying of the foundation stone took place in the presence of the Anglican Bishop for Northern and Central Europe, Jonathan Titcomb, and prominent representatives of the city. The church was built with the support of the British and US consulates. The consecration of the Church of the Ascension took place in June 1885, and the name was later changed to All Saints Church.

Mothes based his plans on the English early Gothic style. The floor plan of the church was similar to a Latin cross. There were side aisles in the nave. A high timber roof truss rose above the nave. The front on Sebastian-Bach-Strasse was decorated with a rose window, and a long vestibule connected to the entrance area. A church tower in the left entrance area, which had originally been planned, was never built.

The Anglo-American Church housed a pipe organ. From 1894 to 1898, Thomas James Crawford was the organist here.

With the outbreak of war in 1914, the active community dissolved.

=== Subsequent use and war destruction ===
During the Weimar Republic, the building was used by a German free church, the Pentecostal congregation "Christliche Gemeinde e. V.". During the Allied air raids on Leipzig on 4 December 1943 and in the spring of 1945, the church, like other buildings of the southern Bachstrasse was badly damaged. After the Second World War, it was briefly used as a material storage facility until it was blown up - so its damage still allowed this type of use. It thus shares the fate of several former churches in Leipzig. It is not known who was the owner of the sacred building at the time the church was blown up.

== Present: Forum Thomanum ==
In the 2000s, the former church grounds were integrated into the educational campus Forum Thomanum: the primary school forum thomanum was built on the site.

== Congregation "Leipzig English Church" ==
Only after the peaceful revolution in East Germany was a new congregation of English-speaking Christians founded in 1995 with the help of the British Missionary Society under the name Leipzig English Church (LEC), which belongs to the Church of England and is supported by the Intercontinental Church Society. It is also a member of the Association of Anglican-Episcopal Congregations in Germany, the Association of Christian Churches in Germany and the German Evangelical Alliance.

The parish has been holding its services in the parish hall of St. Andrew's Church again since 2012. Since 2014, a German-language service has been held in addition to the English-language service. The driving force behind this was Revd. Canon Martin Reakes-Williams, who was pastor of this parish until November 2021. The Association of Friends of the Anglican Parish in Leipzig e. V. is located at Shakespearestrasse 53, where the parish office is also located.

== See also ==
- American Church of St. John in Dresden
- All Saints Church, Dresden
