= Einkommende Zeitungen =

German newspaper

- Type: Daily newspaper
- Founded: July 1, 1650
- Language: German
- Headquarters: Leipzig, Germany

Einkommende Zeitungen was a German newspaper published from Leipzig, Germany by Timotheus Ritzsch. It was the first daily newspaper in the world.
