= Leipzig Book Fair =

Second largest book fair in Germany

Coordinates: 51°23′48″N 12°24′10″E

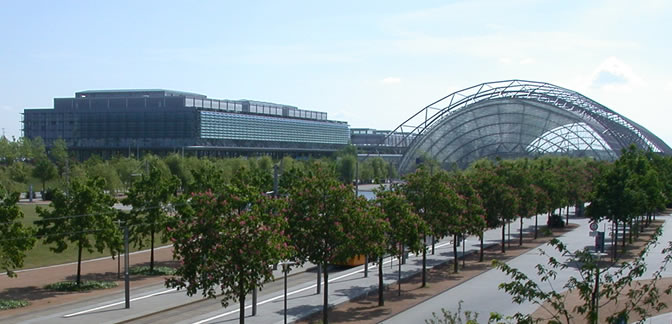
The Leipziger Messe Fairgrounds, home of the book fair

The Leipzig Book Fair (German: Leipziger Buchmesse) is the second largest book fair in Germany after the Frankfurt Book Fair. The fair takes place annually over four days at the Leipzig Trade Fairground in the northern part of Leipzig, Saxony. It is the first large trade meeting of the year and as such it plays an important role in the market and is often where new publications are first presented. The next event will be held on 18–21 March 2027.

The Leipzig Book Fair generates most of its revenue from the general public. The evening program includes readings by authors in bookshops, cafes and the historic Leipzig City Hall.

== History ==
The Leipzig Fair has its origins in the 15th century. The Leipzig Book Fair became the largest book fair in Germany in 1632 when it topped the fair in Frankfurt am Main in the number of books presented; Frankfurt featured 100 books, compared to Leipzig's 700 that year. The success and importance of the fair is linked to the emergence of a vibrant publishing industry in the city. By the 16th century, Leipzig was home to the first daily newspaper, Einkommende Zeitungen, as well as the Reclam Universal Library. Catalogs of the books included in the sale were produced from 1594 to 1860. Throughout the 1700s and 1800s, the fair was an important event for European book sellers, and was hosted twice yearly, occurring around Easter (Ostermesse) and St. Micheals (Michaelismesse).

It remained on top until 1945 when Leipzig became part of socialist East Germany and Frankfurt, in West Germany surpassed it to regain the number one spot. During the East German era the fair remained an important meeting place for book lovers and sellers from both East and West Germany. It provided access to Western publications for East Germans, who were not legally allowed to purchase the material, but could read it at the Fair. After German Reunification, the fair moved from the Trade Fair House Messehaus am Markt in the inner city (Markt / Petersstrasse) to a new location removed from the city center. After the move, the fair experienced a renaissance and continues to grow until the break by the COVID-19 pandemic.

== Profile ==
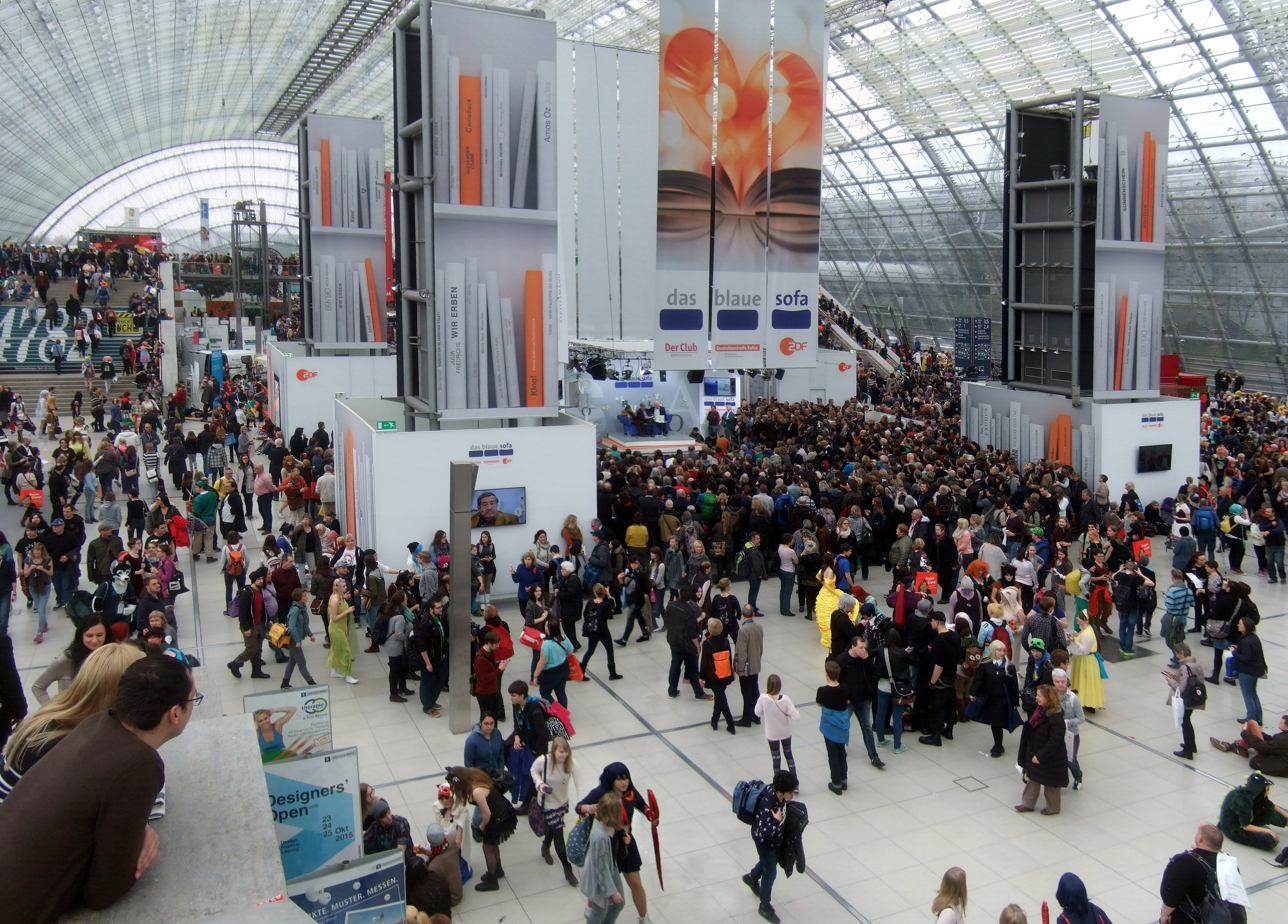
The Leipzig Book Fair in 2015

Today, the fair aims to be for the public, above all, and to emphasize the relationship between the authors and the fair's visitors. The new orientation is necessary to compete with Frankfurt Book Fair, which sees a much larger volume of industry trading. The Leipzig Fair was one of the first to recognize the growing market for audiobooks and incorporate this trend into its concept.

=== "Leipzig liest" ===
In parallel to the exhibitions, the Leipzig book fair is notable for its reading festival 'Leipzig liest'. During the four-day fair Leipzig hosts over 3,600 events (2018) both in various locations throughout the city and at the fairgrounds, making it the largest event of its kind in Europe.

=== Awards ===
The fair is the site of the presentation of several important German book prizes: The Leipzig Book Fair Prize (2002–2004 the German Book Prize), and the Leipzig Book Award for European Understanding. The fair also sees the nominations for the Deutscher Jugendliteraturpreis.

== Numbers ==
In 2010 the fair experienced record attendance, registering 156,000 visitors and 2071 publishers from 39 countries. In 2012 there were 163,000 visitors, and in 2019, 286,000 visitors.

== See also ==
- Books in Germany
- Diethild Wickboldt
