= Leipzig Calvinist storm =

Theological dispute in Leipzig

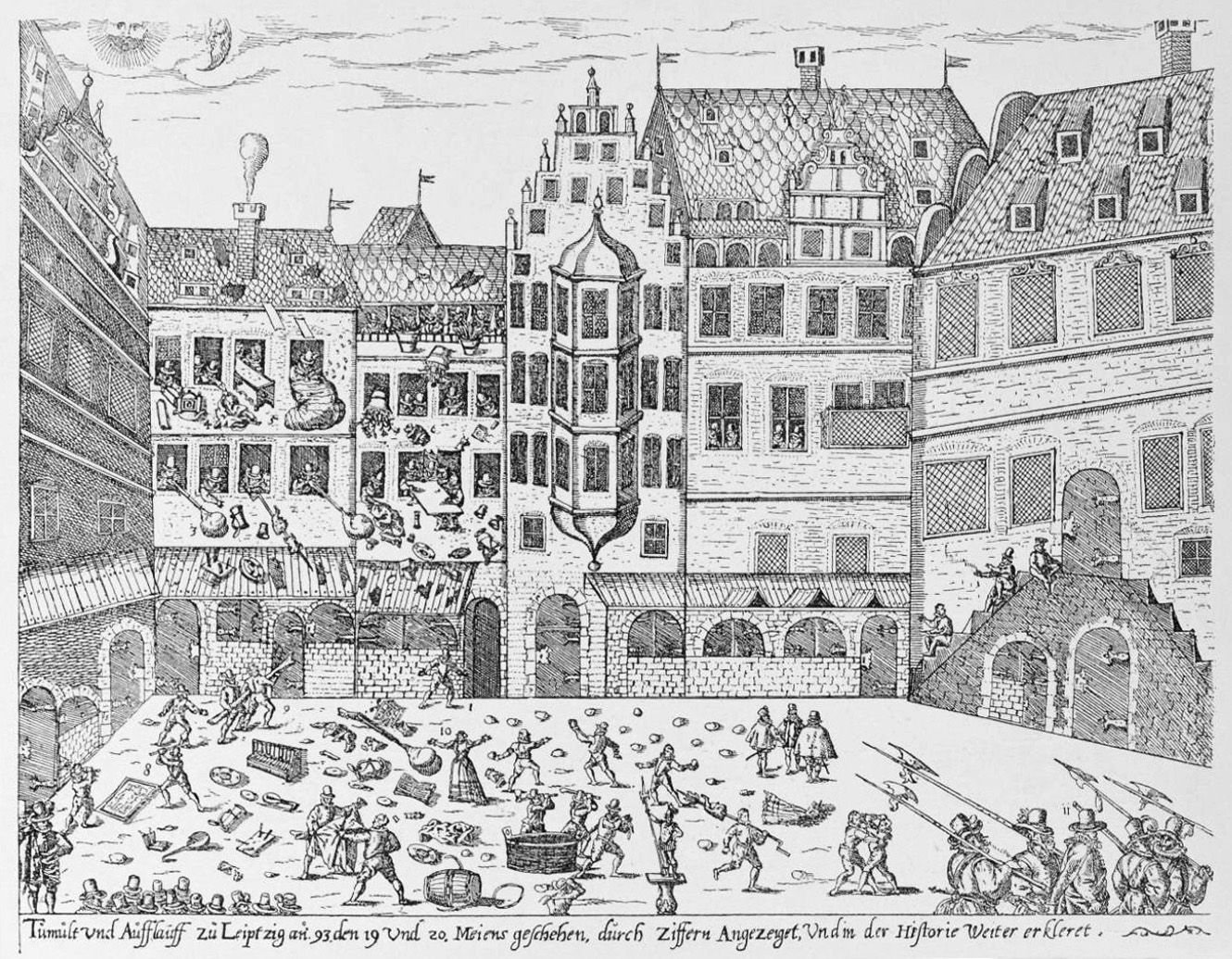
- Storming and plundering of the house of the Calvinist Adolph Weinhaus on the Naschmarkt in Leipzig on 20 May 1593
- Location: Leipzig, Electorate of Saxony
- Date: 1593
- Target: Crypto-Calvinists
- Attack type: Mob violence
- Deaths: 4 men beheaded
- Perpetrator: mob
- Motive: theological dispute

The Calvinist storm (German: Calvinistensturm) is the name given to the tumultuous climax of the theological dispute between the Orthodox Lutherans and the Calvinists in Leipzig in the Electorate of Saxony in May 1593, in which the houses of wealthy Calvinist-minded merchants were stormed and plundered.

== Prehistory ==
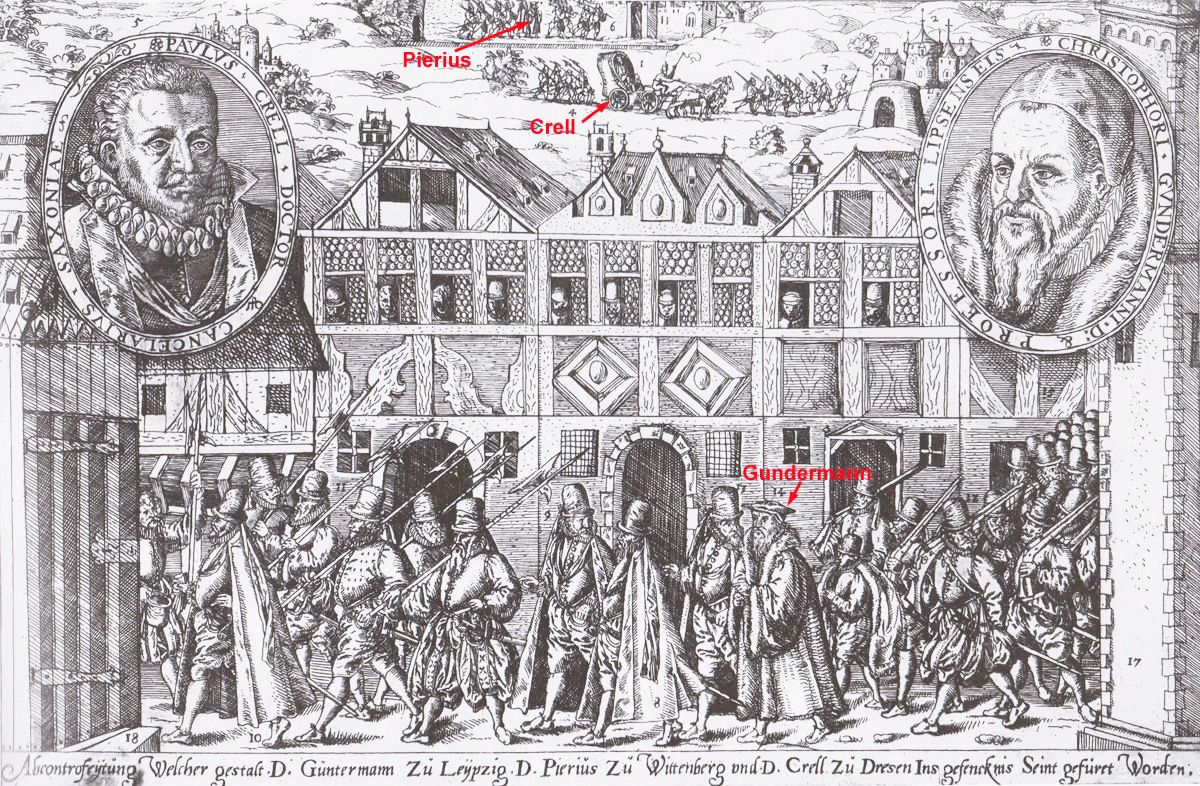
The arrest of Gundermann (main picture) and other Calvinists

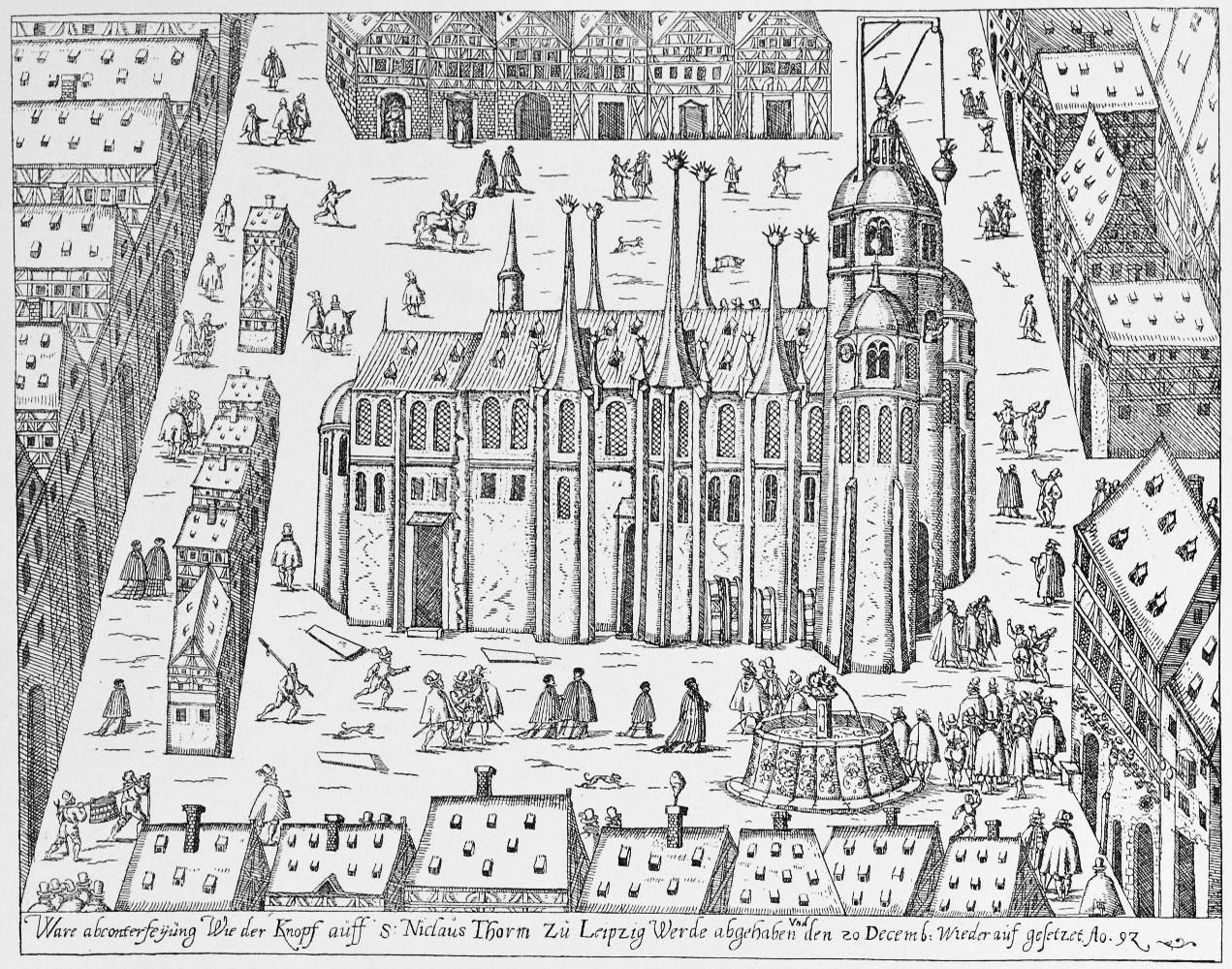
Inspection of the tower sphere of Leipzig's St. Nicholas Church in 1592 for Calvinist writings

At the end of the 1580s, under Elector Christian I (1560–1592) and Chancellor Nikolaus Krell (1550–1601), Lutheran orthodoxy, which had been developing since Luther's death, was pushed back in the Electorate of Saxony, and those inclined towards Calvinism gained influence. Leipzig in particular had become a centre of so-called covert Calvinism (crypto-Calvinism) due to the immigration of Dutch merchants. In 1589, the Lutheran Orthodox Leipzig University professor and pastor of St. Thomas's Church, Nikolaus Selnecker (1530–1592), was replaced by the Calvinist Christoph Gundermann (1549–1622). Other influential offices were also filled by Calvinists.

The situation changed with the death of Christian I in 1591 and the disempowerment and later (1601) execution of Krell. Under the influence of the Elector's widow, Sophie of Brandenburg (1568–1622), and the guardianship government of Friedrich Wilhelm I, Duke of Saxe-Weimar (1562–1602) (for the still underage Christian II. (1583–1611)) the old order was consistently restored. As early as December 15, 1591, Pastor Gundermann was arrested as a Calvinist and transferred to the Pleissenburg. In February 1592, the state assembly decided to remove all Calvinists from administrations, courts, schools and churches.

In Leipzig, all persons suspected of Calvinism had to appear at the town hall and sign their renunciation of Calvinism. Four councillors refused to sign, which resulted in their dismissal from office. The persecution of Calvinism went so far that in December 1592 the tower sphere of the St. Nicholas Church, which had been renovated in 1591, was examined, because Calvinist writings were suspected in it, but none were found. In Leipzig, religious tensions were mixed with social ones, as the immigrant rich merchants were mostly Calvinist-minded.

== The uprising ==
On 14 May 1593, in the house of the merchant Adolph Weinhaus, who was suspected of being a Calvinist, there was a fierce dispute between the Lutheran Orthodox theologian Samuel Huber (1547–1624) from Wittenberg and Calvinist-minded attendees about the correct interpretation of the Bible, in which the Wittenberg resident was "badly treated". On May 19, leaflets appeared in the city, according to the text written by students, calling for the destruction of the Weinhaus house. Protective measures requested by Weinhaus from the city council were only half-hearted. Weinhaus was able to fend off a first attack on the same evening with rifle shots. On May 20, an angry crowd, mainly journeymen and students, stormed the house and threw all the household goods into the street. Weinhaus had been able to flee in the meantime. The houses of other wealthy Calvinist suspects were also attacked.

Only now, when the revolt threatened to become uncontrollable, did the city council call on the citizens who were well-disposed towards it to put down the uprising. Together with the city mercenaries, they put an end to the goings-on, but only after the council had assured the expulsion of certain Calvinist citizens (possibly economic competitors).

== Aftermath ==
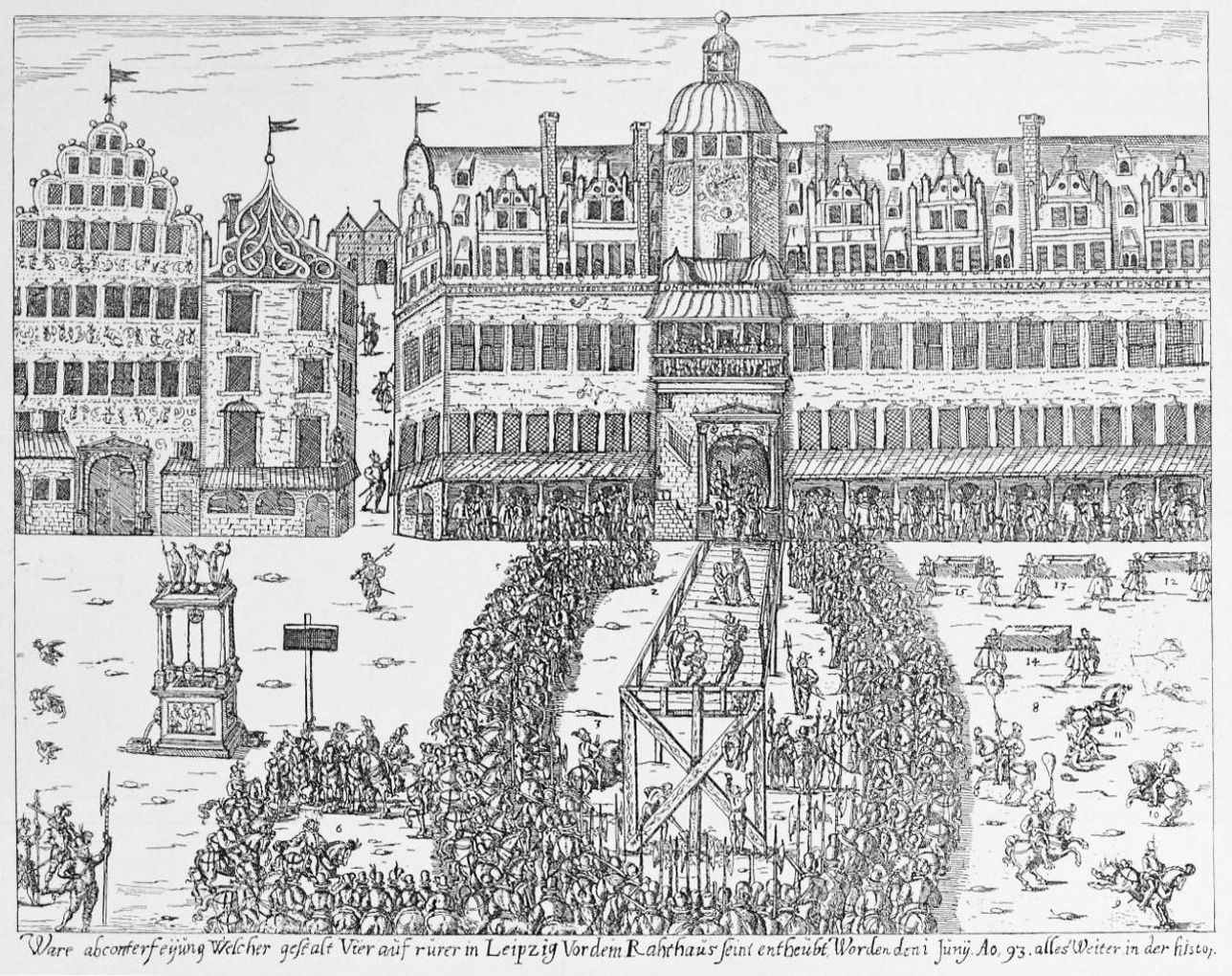
Beheading of four leaders of the Calvinist storm on the market square in Leipzig on 1 June 1593

The next day, two governors were appointed by an administrator of the state government, who had to organize the severe punishment of the perpetrators. In St. Thomas's Church, a warning sermon was held against possible repetitions. About forty people had been arrested after the riots. Nineteen of them were tortured. Eventually, four of them were sentenced to death by the sword. The execution took place on 1 June 1593 on Leipzig's market square.

The four death row inmates were the furrier's journeyman Ambrosius Bartsch, called Fürst, a carpenter's journeyman as well as a day labourer and a bricklayer. Students, who were the co-initiators, were not punished or wealthy citizens of Leipzig, among whom were presumably to be found the intellectual arsonists who carried out their competitive struggles under the religious pretext. The promised expulsion of Calvinist citizens was also only partially realized.

There was no peace. Four weeks after the public execution, a folwark belonging to Peter Roth south of the city (what is now Südvorstadt was set on fire under the pretext that he was hiding Calvinists there. After the reconstruction, the estate was called Brandvorwerk (English: Fire folwark).
