= Alte Handelsbörse =

Former Leipzig stock exchange building

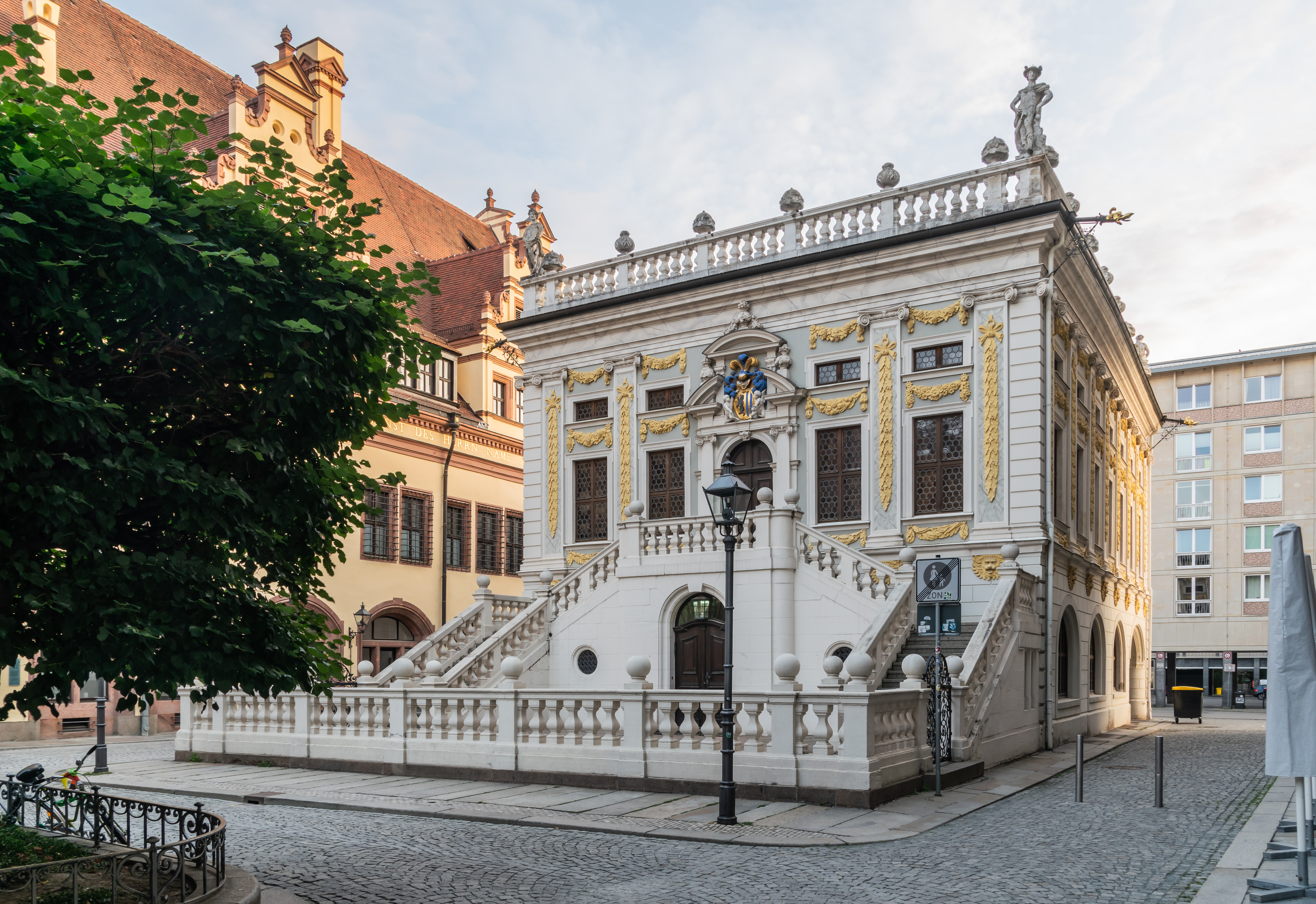
- Alte Handelsbörse in Leipzig
- Interactive map of the Alte Handelsbörse area

General information
- Type: Exchange
- Architectural style: Baroque
- Location: Naschmarkt, Leipzig, Saxony, Germany
- Coordinates: 51°20′27″N 12°22′33″E

The Alte Handelsbörse or Alte Börse (Old exchange) in Leipzig, Saxony, Germany, is the city's oldest assembly building of merchants, and also the oldest Baroque building. Built as the Börse in 1678, it is now used as an event venue and is known in English as the Old Stock Exchange.

== History ==
Leipzig has always been an important trading centre, being at the intersection of two historical trade routes, and trade fairs have been held here for nearly a millennium. The initiative to build a Börse, as a neutral exchange place to conduct business and seal deals, came in 1667 from 30 major merchants after complaints by foreign merchants. The city council took the decisive decision to build the Börse on 6 May 1678. The building was probably designed by Johann Georg Starcke, a master builder at the court of John George II, Elector of Saxony, in Dresden. Construction began at the Naschmarkt adjacent to the Old Town Hall on 30 May 1678. The Börse was used already from 1679, but the artwork in the interior was completed only in 1687. The ground floor had rooms rented to merchants, the upper floor offered a hall, Börsensaal, for auctions, balls and other events.

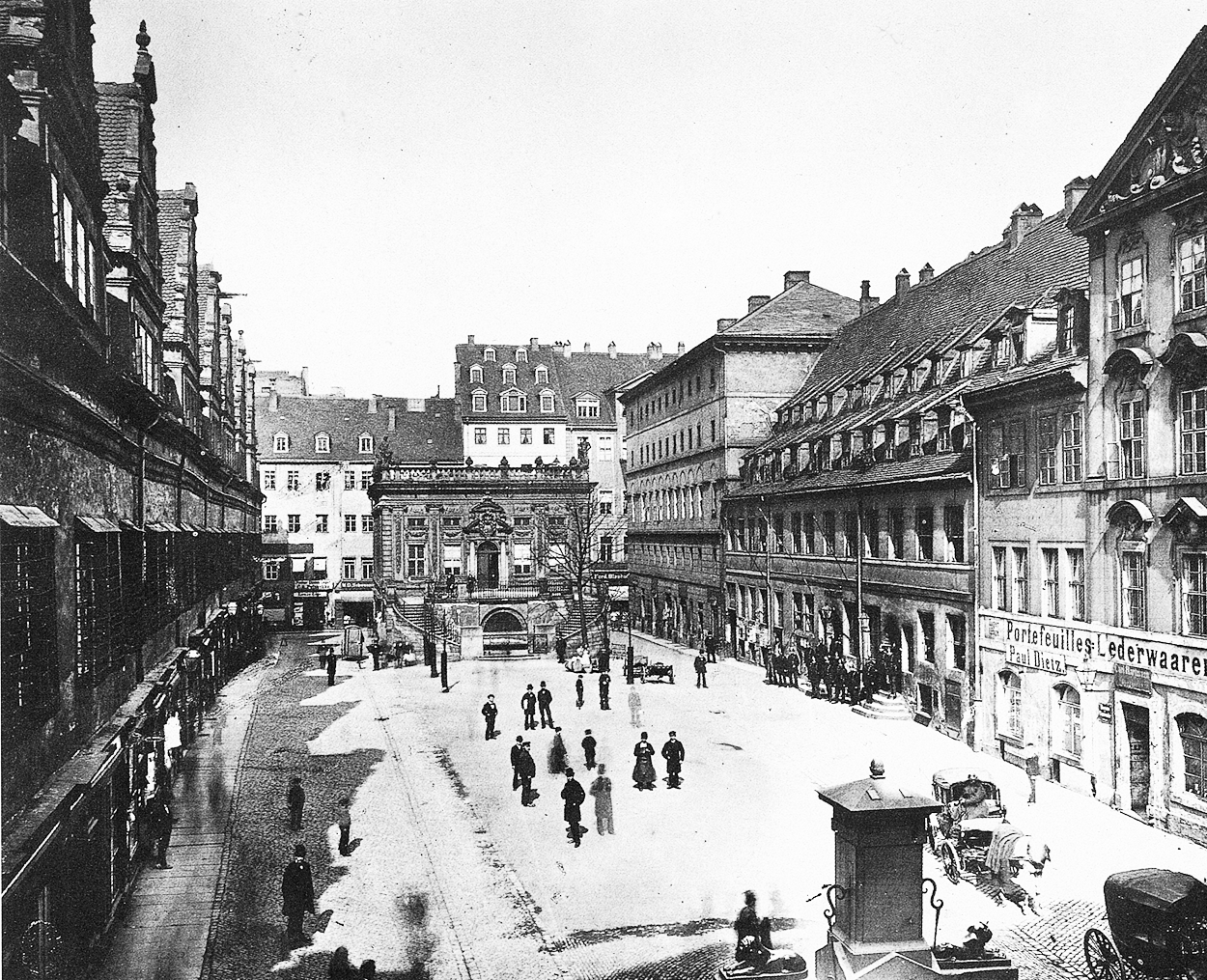
Alte Börse at the end of the Naschmarkt, c. 1880

After the end of the German campaign of 1813 and the reopening of the exchange, the building was rebuilt and extended in 1816 according to the designs of the Leipzig building director Johann Carl Friedrich Dauthe and the Karlsruhe building director Friedrich Weinbrenner. With the growth of the trade fair in the second half of the 19th century, it was decided to build the new stock exchange. When it was completed in 1886, the old exchange building was named Alte Handelsbörse (or Alte Börse).

After 1887, the Börsensaal served as a meeting room for the city councillors. Between 1905 and 1907, a porch built in 1816 was demolished and the original shape of the building was restored.

During the Second World War, the Börse burnt down completely in 1943, resulting in the irretrievable loss of the valuable stucco ceiling and ceiling paintings. The building was secured with an emergency roof. Restoration of the exterior began in 1955, completed in 1962. Since then, the Alte Börse has been used for cultural events such as readings, concerts and exhibitions. Between 1992 and 1995, the facade and the interior were extensively renovated, with a focus on the original colouring of the facades and the window glazing in the style of the 17th century.

== Architecture ==
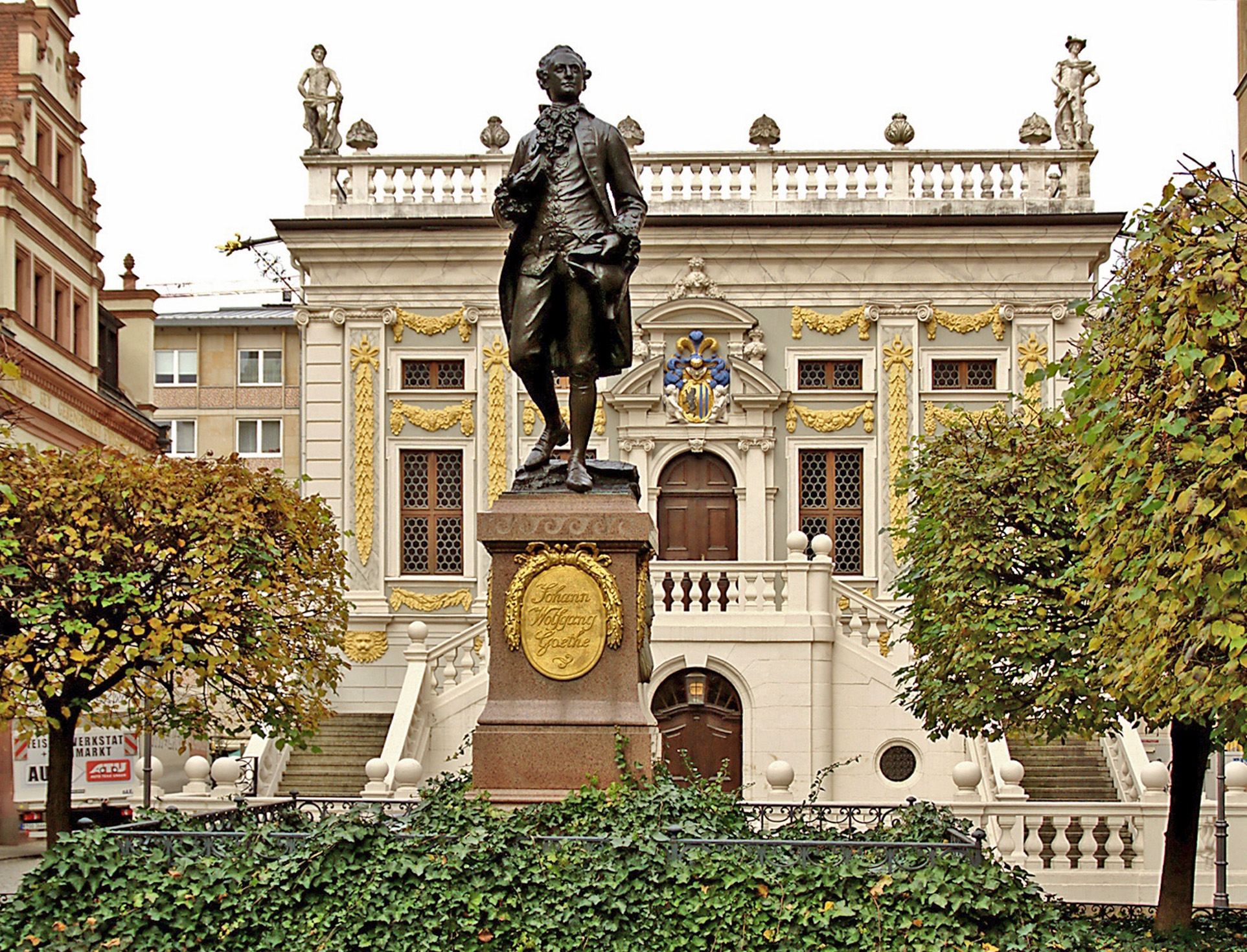
Goethe Monument in front of the Alte Börse

The design of the Börse shows parallels in many details to the Palais im Großen Garten and the Lusthaus in the Italian Garden in Dresden. Builders involved included the Leipzig master mason Christian Richter, the stonemasons Andreas Junghans from Rochlitz, Hans Caspar Beck from Laucha and Melchior Bock from Zeitz as well as the master carpenter Christian Schmied. The last features to be completed were a stucco ceiling by Giovanni Simonetti and seven allegorical ceiling paintings by Johann Heinrich am Ende.

The Börse is a freestanding building with two floors and a flat roof, accessed by an open two-way staircase. It has a plaster facade, embellished all around with flat pilasters with Ionic capitals and festoons. A sandstone balustrade has round-arched portals. Above the staircase, two winged putti hold the Leipzig city coat of arms. The front features two statues, of Apollo and Mercury, the god of the merchants, while the back has Minerva and Venus. The facades of the building are evenly spaced on all sides with high rectangular windows and low transverse rectangular windows above. The Alte Handelsbörse thus combines elements of both Dutch and Italian Baroque.

== See also ==
- Architecture of Leipzig - Baroque era
- Leipzig merchant bourgeoisie
