= Naschmarkt (Leipzig) =

Square in Leipzig, Germany

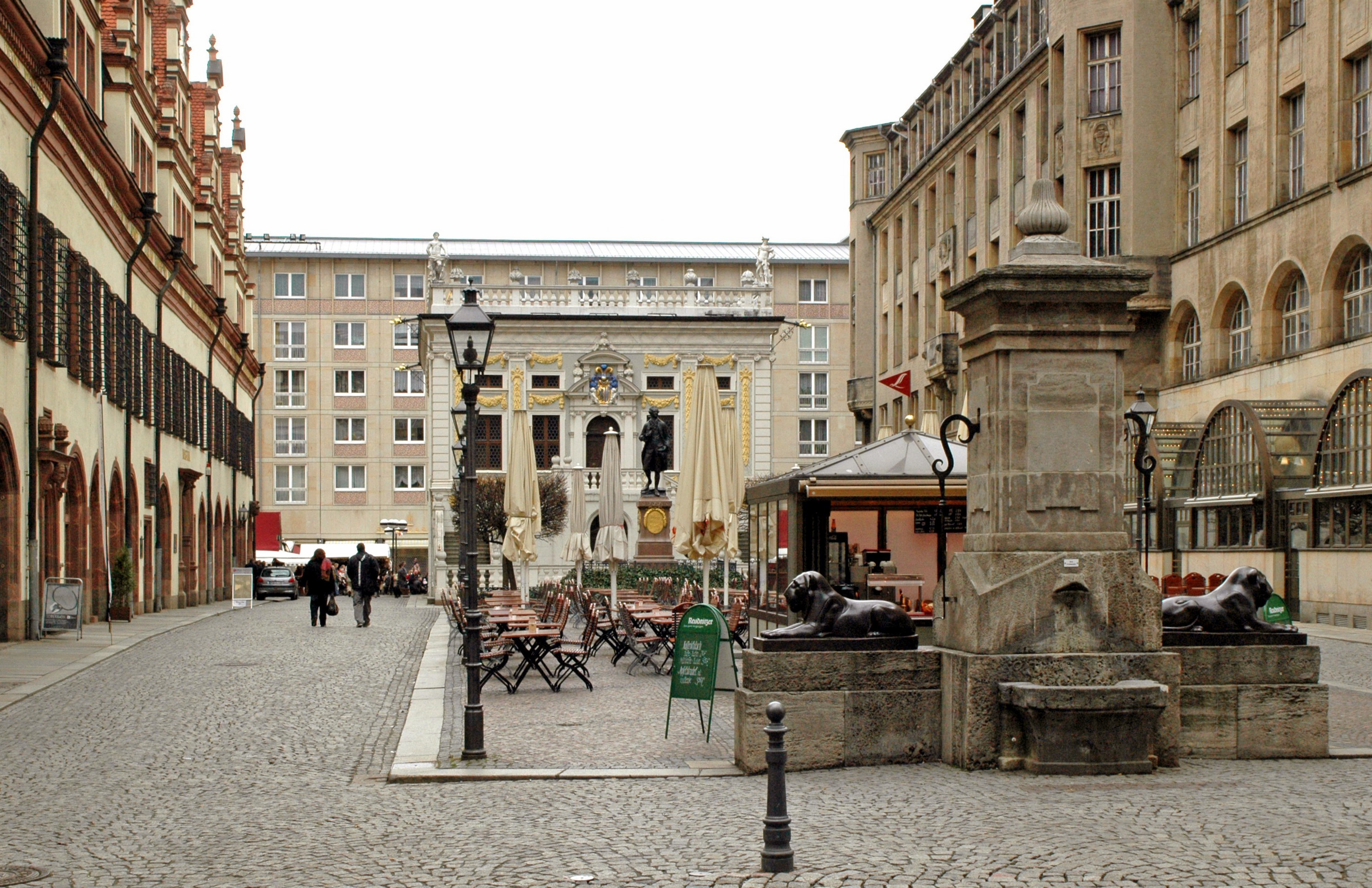
- Interactive map of Naschmarkt
- Length: 90 m (300 ft)
- Width: 20 metres (66 ft)
- Location: Leipzig-Mitte, Leipzig, Germany
- Postal code: 04109
- Coordinates: 51°20′25.4″N 12°22′36.6″E

The Naschmarkt is a small square in the city center of Leipzig. It owes its name to a time when fruit was traded here, which was also considered a sweet treat at the time. Today it serves as an open-air restaurant in the warmer months of the year, while before Christmas it hosts part of the Christmas market.

== Location and shape ==
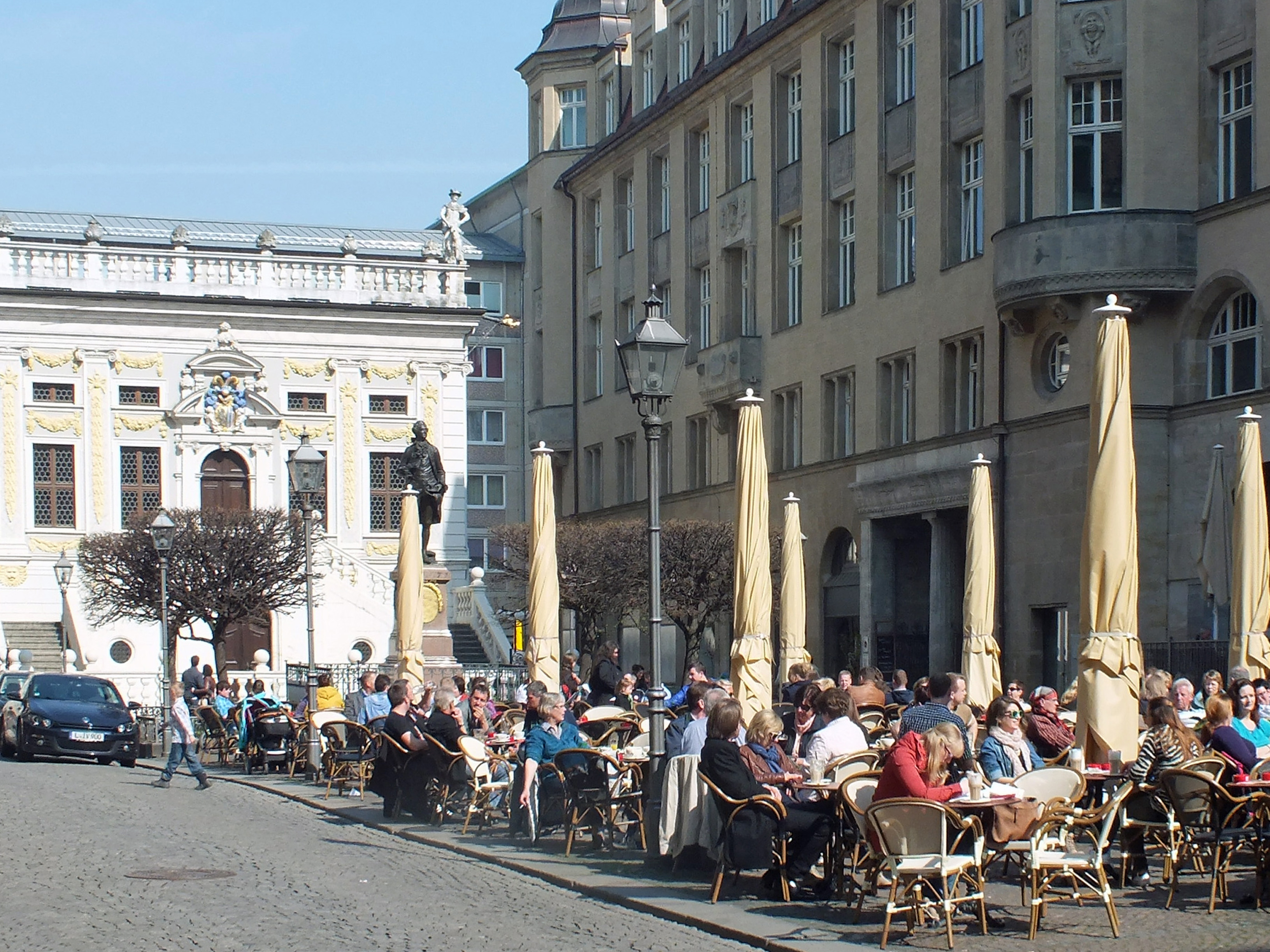
An early spring day at the Naschmarkt 2014

The Naschmarkt is located behind the Old Town Hall between Grimmaische Strasse and Salzgäßchen. It forms a narrow square 90 metres (295 ft) long and about 20 metres (66 ft) wide, opening slightly to the north.

At the north end is the baroque Alte Handelsbörse (Old Stock Exchange Building) and in front of it, in a small green area, is the memorial to Goethe, depicting the young Johann Wolfgang von Goethe (1749–1832). Then comes the usable area of the square, before it ends at Grimmaische Strasse with the Lion Fountain. The east side of the square, opposite the Old Town Hall, is bordered by the Handelshof building, today the Steigenberger Grandhotel Leipzig with the ALEX restaurant in the Burgkeller. A passage from the Naschmarkt through the Old Town Hall leads to the market and another through the Handelshof into Reichsstrasse.

== History ==
The Naschmarkt was created in 1556 when the Old Town Hall was being built, when large areas of old buildings were being demolished. It was used for the trade in food, but also for public performances such as those by the Neuberin theater troupe. Until 1679, the so-called herring stalls for the sale of salted fish stood here, which led to the name herring market.

In the events referred to as the Leipzig Calvinist storm, the house of the Calvinist-minded merchant Adolph Weinhaus, located on the Naschmarkt, was stormed and plundered by an angry crowd on 20 May 1593.

Afterwards, the Old Stock Exchange was built here, which was already in use as an unfinished building in 1679 and was completed by 1687. In front of it, the Hercules Fountain with a statue of Hercules was erected in 1688. Around 1820, the fountain was moved to the southern edge of the square and redesigned as a lion fountain with bronze lions based on a design by Johann Gottfried Schadow (1764–1850). When the fountain was reconstructed to its current appearance in 1918 by Hugo Licht (1841–1923), the wooden parts were replaced with stone and the Schadow lions were retained.

From 1703 onwards, the Naschmarkt was the central meeting place for sedan chair carriers, 24 carriers for 12 sedan chairs.

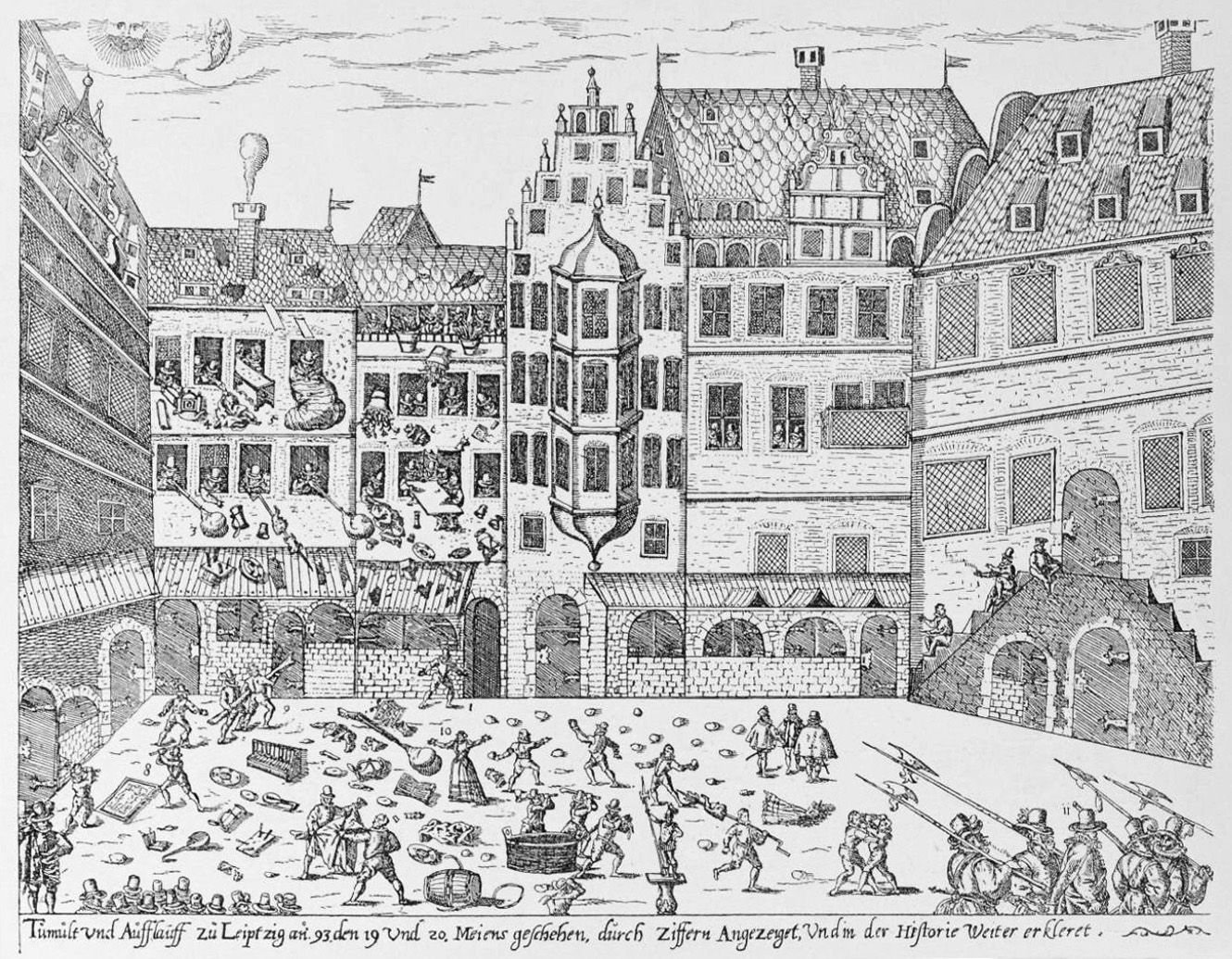
Looting of the house of the merchant Adolph Weinhaus on the Naschmarkt in 1593

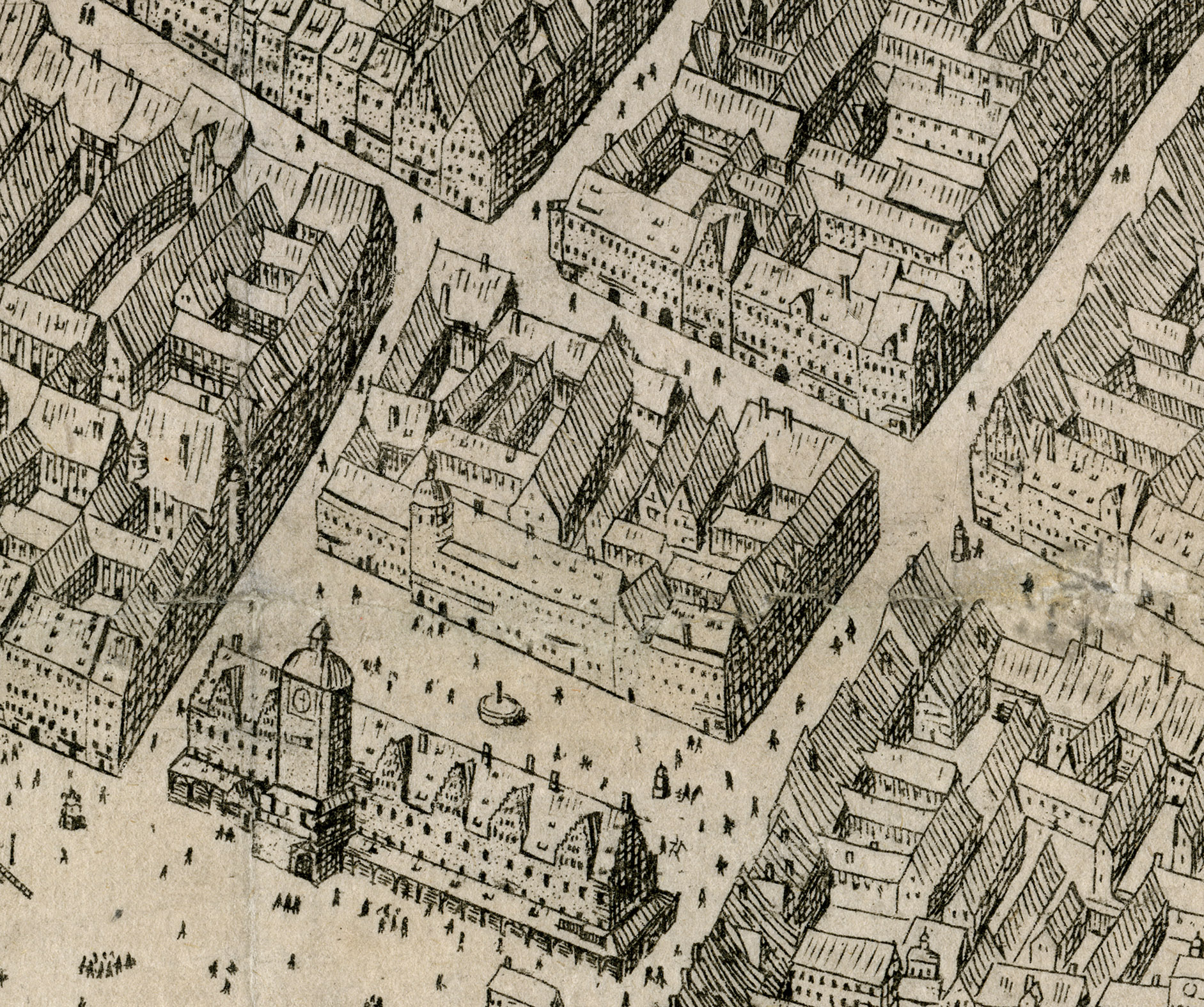
The Naschmarkt 1646

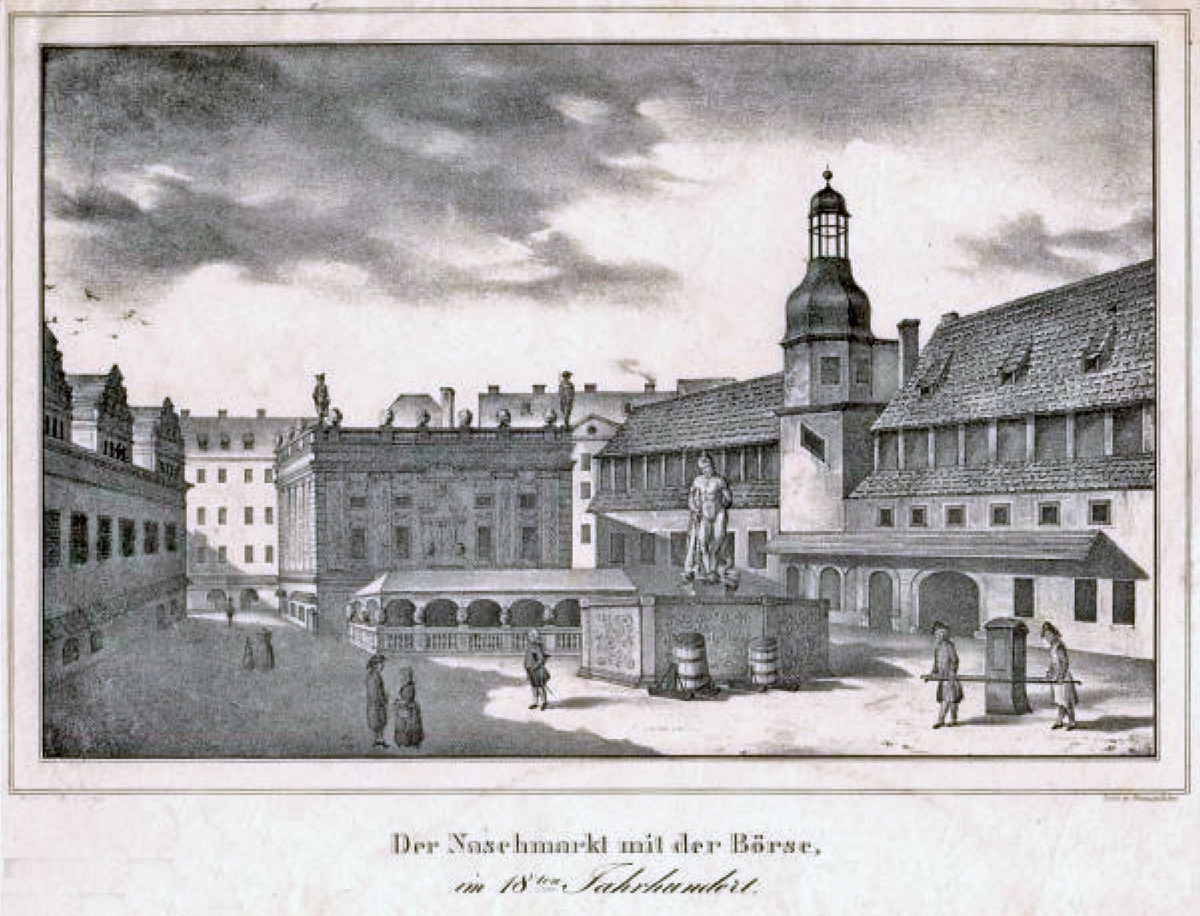
The Naschmarkt before 1800 with sedan chair bearers

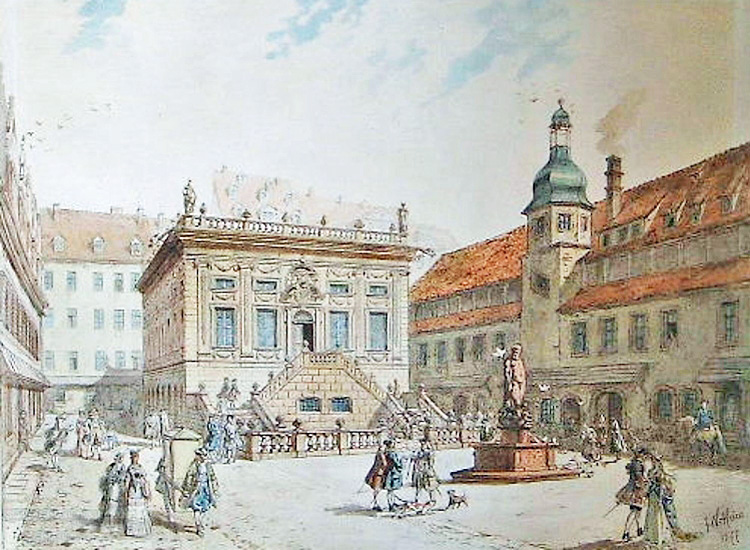
1800 – with debtor's tower and Hercules fountain

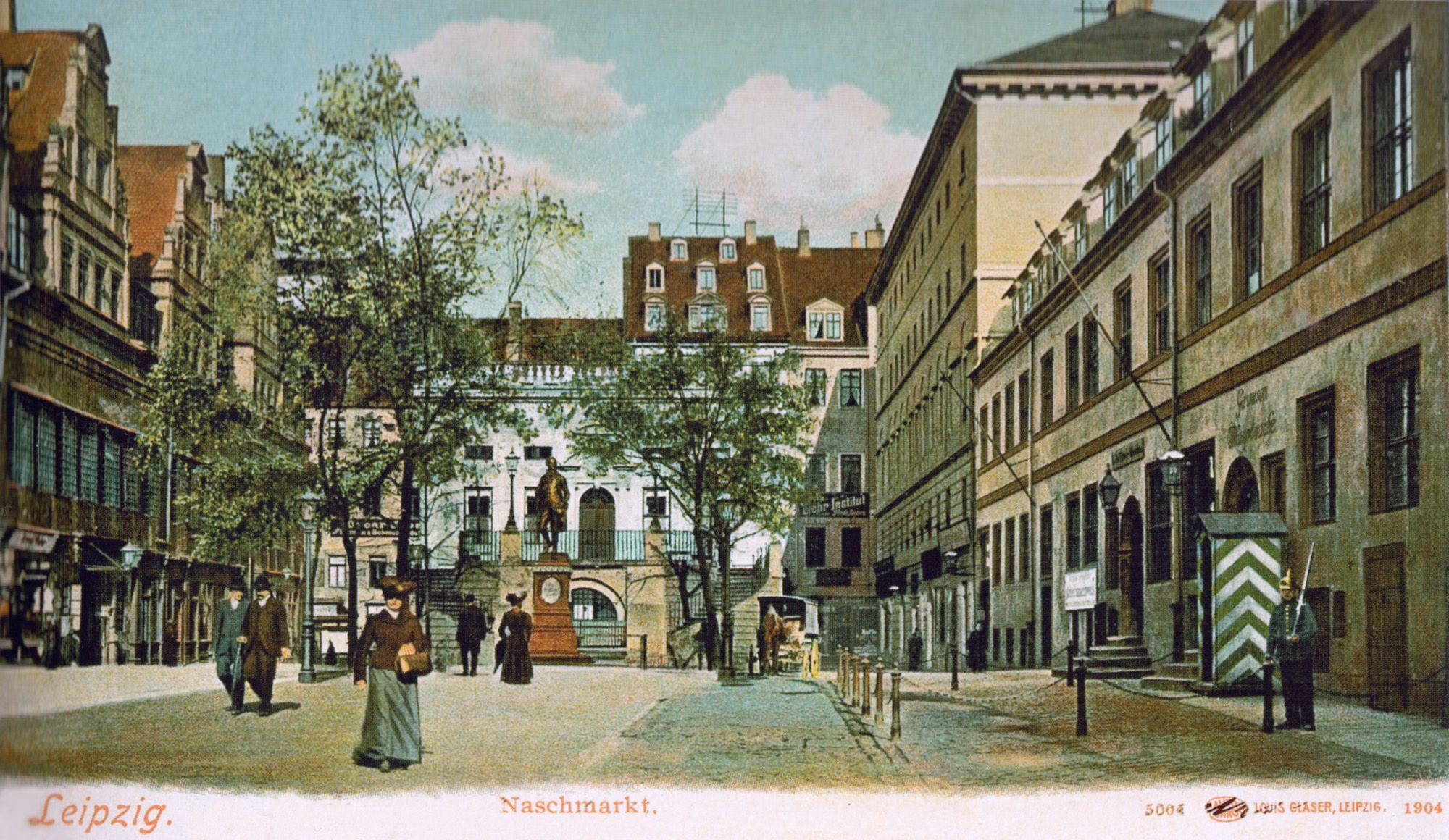
1904 – with stock house and police station

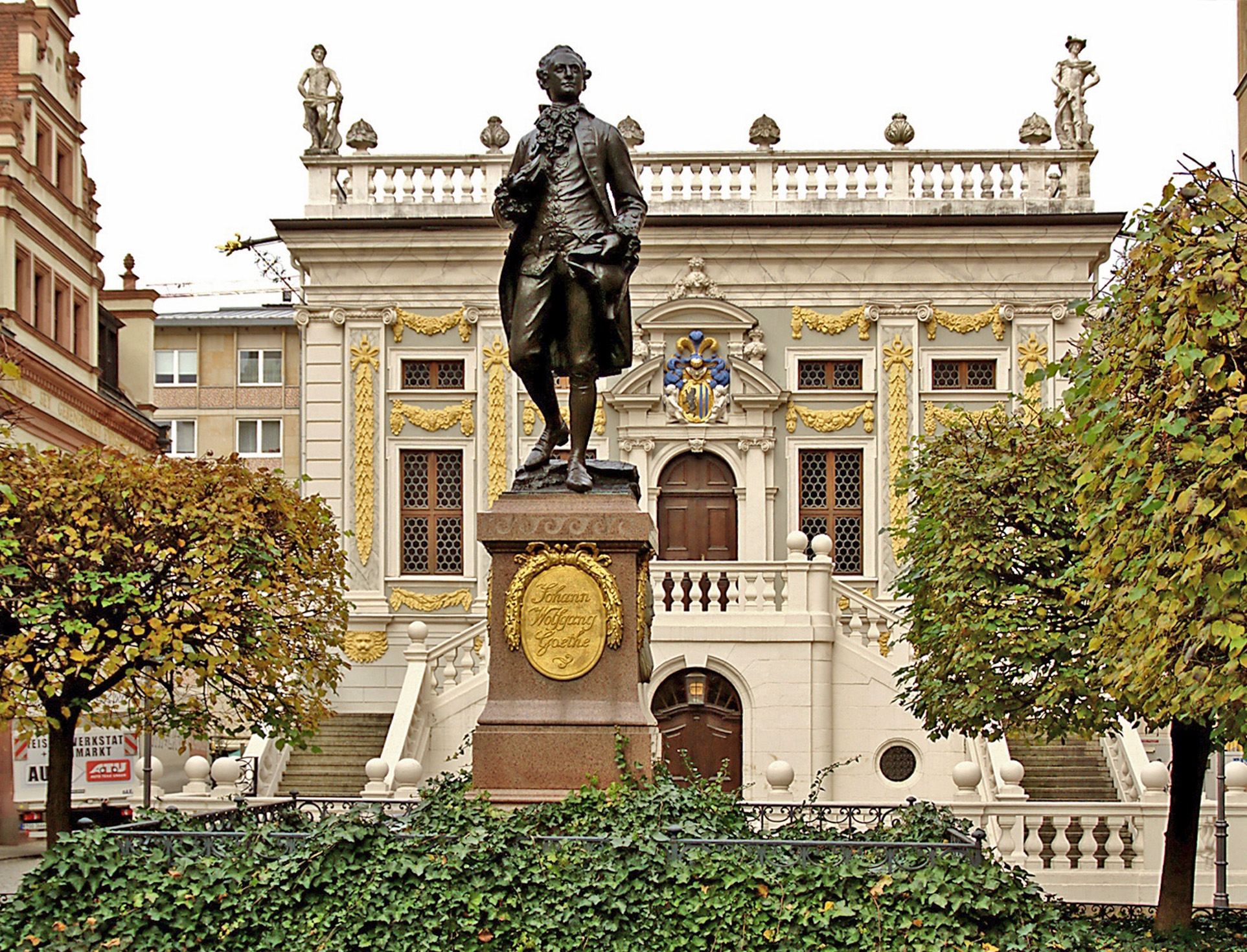
The memorial to Goethe from 1903

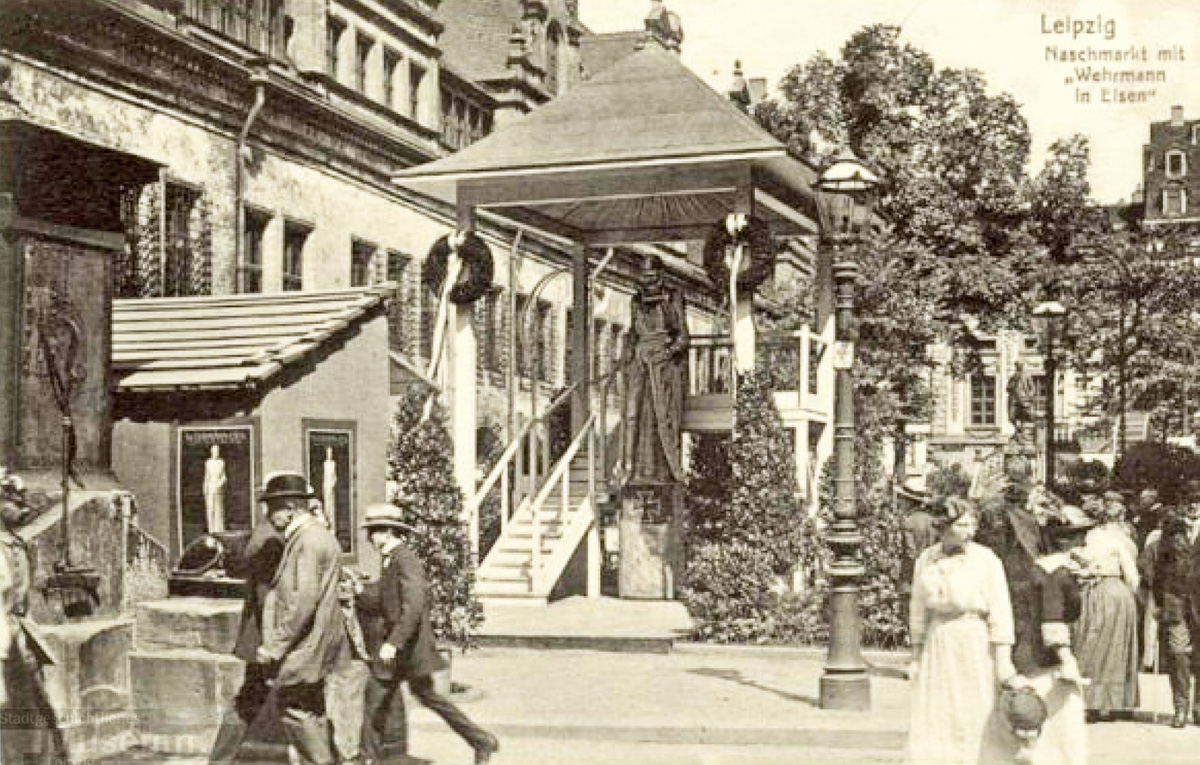
The soldier in iron 1915

Since the second half of the 16th century, the east side of the square had been built up with several buildings of municipal institutions on the site of the former Burgkeller (burgess cellar) block: the cookshop (1565), the shoe and fur shop (1572) and the bread and meat counters (1578). There was also a tower with some detention cells. This and the northern part gave way to the Stockhaus, an inner-city prison, at the beginning of the 19th century, and in 1830 the guard room of the Leipzig municipal guard moved into the neighboring building, along with the police and tax authorities. In 1903, the memorial to Goethe was created by Carl Seffner (1861–1932) in front of the stock exchange, commemorating Goethe's time from 1765 to 1768 as a student in Leipzig. In 1908/1909 the entire east side was replaced by the new Handelshof trade fair building.

In 1877, the end of the Naschmarkt seemed to have been decided, when it was to be incorporated into a larger town hall building, which was never built. In 1915, the Wehrmann in Eisen (soldier in iron), a sculpture created by Mathieu Molitor (1873–1929), stood on the square to collect war donations for the First World War. The Naschmarkt was also hit in the bombing raid on 4 December 1943, and the stock exchange burned down completely. The restoration work was completed in 1962. Between 1992 and 1995, the building was extensively renovated, with great emphasis being placed on the colour of the facade and the window glazing in the style of the 17th century.

== See also ==
- Leipzig Calvinist storm
