= Oberhofgericht Leipzig =

Judicial instance of the Electorate and then the Kingdom of Saxony

The Oberhofgericht Leipzig (English: Upper Court of Leipzig) was a judicial instance of the Electorate and then the Kingdom of Saxony from the fifteenth century until 1831.

Until the fifteenth century, the Saxon Hofgericht (court) was linked to the Electors and moved around the country as they did. In 1483, Elector Ernest and his brother, Duke Albert III, established the Oberhofgericht, a court with a fixed seat in Leipzig (at the Old Town Hall Leipzig). The court was controlled by both nobles and Burgers and was the first authority established in Saxony to be independent of the Electors and the court.

The court was founded with authority over all Saxony, but after the Partition of the Wettin lands, it applied only to the Albertine lands (including collateral lines of Saxe-Weissenfels, Saxe-Merseburg and Saxe-Zeitz) from 1483 to 1493 and again from 1547. After 1529, it ceased to have authority over Wittenberg, which came under the jurisdiction of the newly established Electoral Circle (Kurkreis). From 1493 until 1547, the Oberhofgericht met alternately in Leipzig and Altenburg and had authority over both Albertine and Ernestine lands.

In 1488, the court received a new assessor. Later the court was raised to a full bench of twelve people. At the beginning of the nineteenth century, six of these seats belonged to the nobility, including the judges, and six learned men (doctores) with the Professor of law at the University of Leipzig. Both sides were filled out by unpaid, extraordinary assessors.

The Oberhofgericht was primarily in charge of private law and had some control over feudal law. On the other hand, administrative law, criminal law and ecclesiastical law remained outside its control. It was the court of first instance only for members of the Wettin princely house, schriftsässig lords of manors, universities, schriftsässig cities and the holders of important honours and offices, so only these people had direct access to the court. For the majority of Saxons, it was an appellate court.

In 1822, the Oberhofgericht lost its role as an appellate court. With the 1831 state reform in the Kingdom of Saxony, a progressive transformation of the judiciary begun. In the course of this reform, the Oberhofgericht was abolished.

== Bibliography ==
- Hauptstaatsarchiv Dresden
- Deutsches Rechtswörterbuch
- Kretschmann, Christian Gottfried (1804). Geschichte des Churfürstlich Sächsischen Oberhofgerichts zu Leipzig von seiner Entstehung 1483 an bis zum Ausgange des 18. Jahrhunderts: nebst einer kurzen Darstellung seiner gegenwärtigen Verfassung (in German). Leipzig: Crusius.
- Wilde, Manfred (2003). "Verfahren vor dem sächsischen Oberhofgericht in Leipzig". Die Zauberei- und Hexenprozesse in Kursachsen (in German). Cologne: Böhlau. p. 79. ISBN 3-412-10602-X.
