= Goethe Monument (Leipzig) =

- Goethedenkmal (Leipzig) (German)
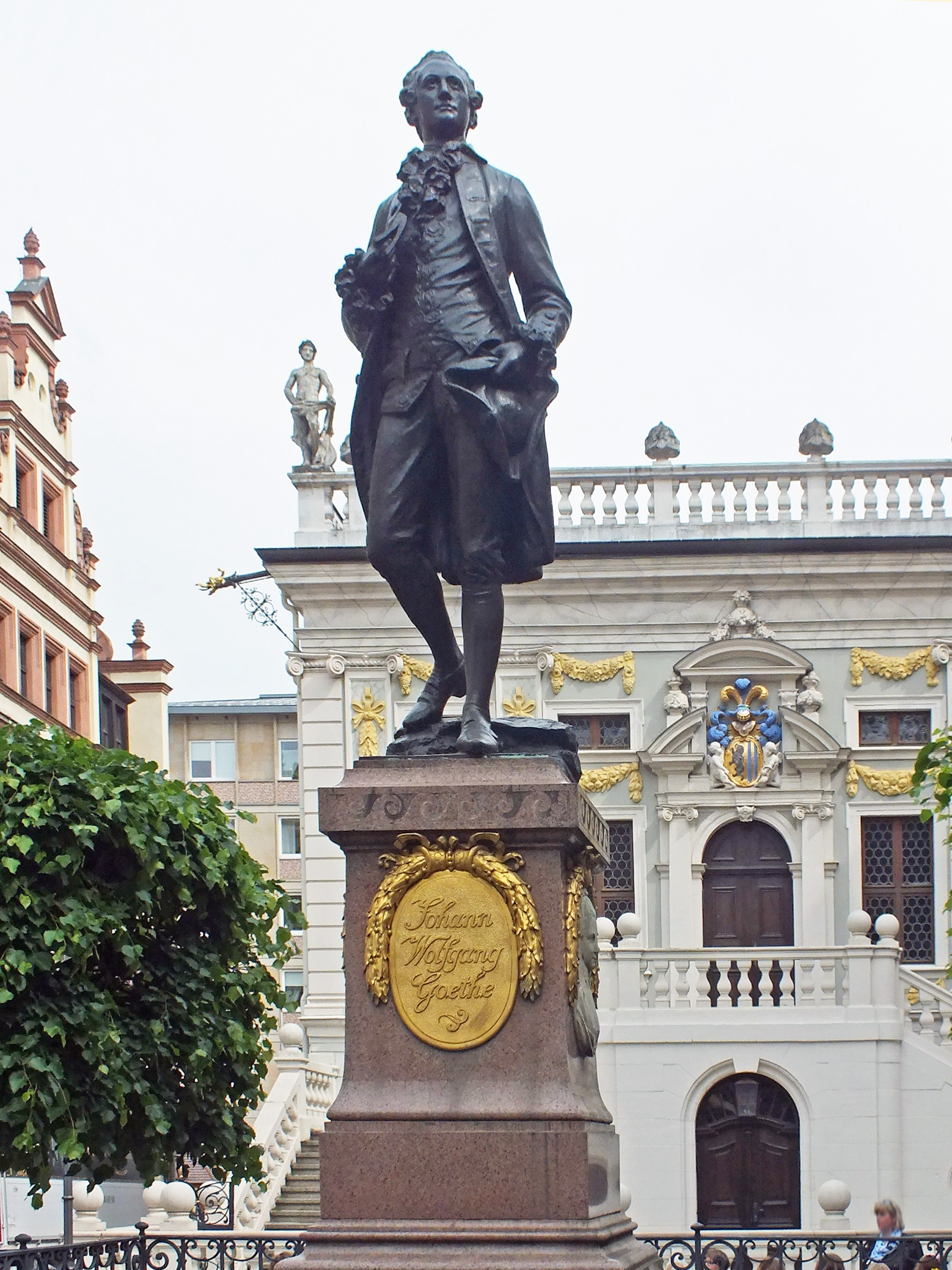
- The Goethe monument on the Naschmarkt in front of the Old Stock Exchange (2015)
- Artist: Carl Seffner
- Completion date: 1903
- Subject: Bronze statue on a pedestal
- Dimensions: 515 cm (203 in)
- Condition: Last restoration in 2024
- Location: Leipzig, Germany; 51.340392°N 12.375717°E

The Goethe Monument in Leipzig, Germany, (German: Goethedenkmal Leipzig) is a bronze statue standing on a tall pedestal on the Naschmarkt in front of the Old Trade Exchange. It depicts Johann Wolfgang von Goethe (1749–1832) as a young man with reference to his almost three years of study in Leipzig. It was created by Carl Seffner (1861–1932).

== History ==
Relatively late compared to other cities with a Goethe connection, in the 1890s, the idea of a Goethe monument matured in Leipzig, with the city archivist Gustav Wustmann (1844–1910) playing a major role. Around 1895, Carl Seffner presented a sketch for a statue of the young Goethe. Initially, a marble statue in a green area was planned. In March 1898, a monument committee issued an appeal for donations to finance a monument after Seffner had submitted a well-formed design for a bronze statue in 1897. In May 1901, the Naschmarkt was chosen as the location, where a trial installation of the model took place on 23 May.

A 28-year-old Leipzig gymnastics teacher in a corresponding theater costume was the model for the casting pattern. Since Seffner did not have a picture of Goethe from his time in Leipzig, he used pictures from later periods of his life for the facial features. The base was designed by the Berlin architect Max Bischoff. The bronze statue was cast in 1902 by the foundry Noack & Brückner. The inauguration took place on June 28, 1903.

To the total costs of 44,000 marks, the city contributed 10,000 marks each from the bequest of Franz Dominic Grassi (1801–1880) and from the foundation of Ferdinand Rhode (1802–1872).

== Monument ==
The 2.65 metres (8.7 ft) tall bronze statue of the young Goethe stands on a 2.5 metres (8.2 ft) tall pedestal made of red granite. The posture, the background of the statue and the rococo costume show that the student is strolling outdoors. The step motif indicates an unforced natural activity, the book in the right hand the intellectual occupation during the walk. It is often interpreted that Goethe came from a walk in the Rosental and went via the Naschmarkt in the direction of Auerbachs Hof, where his friend Ernst Wolfgang Behrisch (1738–1809) lived and with which building he would later be connected in a special way through the scene in Auerbachs Keller in the tragic play Faust, Part One.

The side medallions

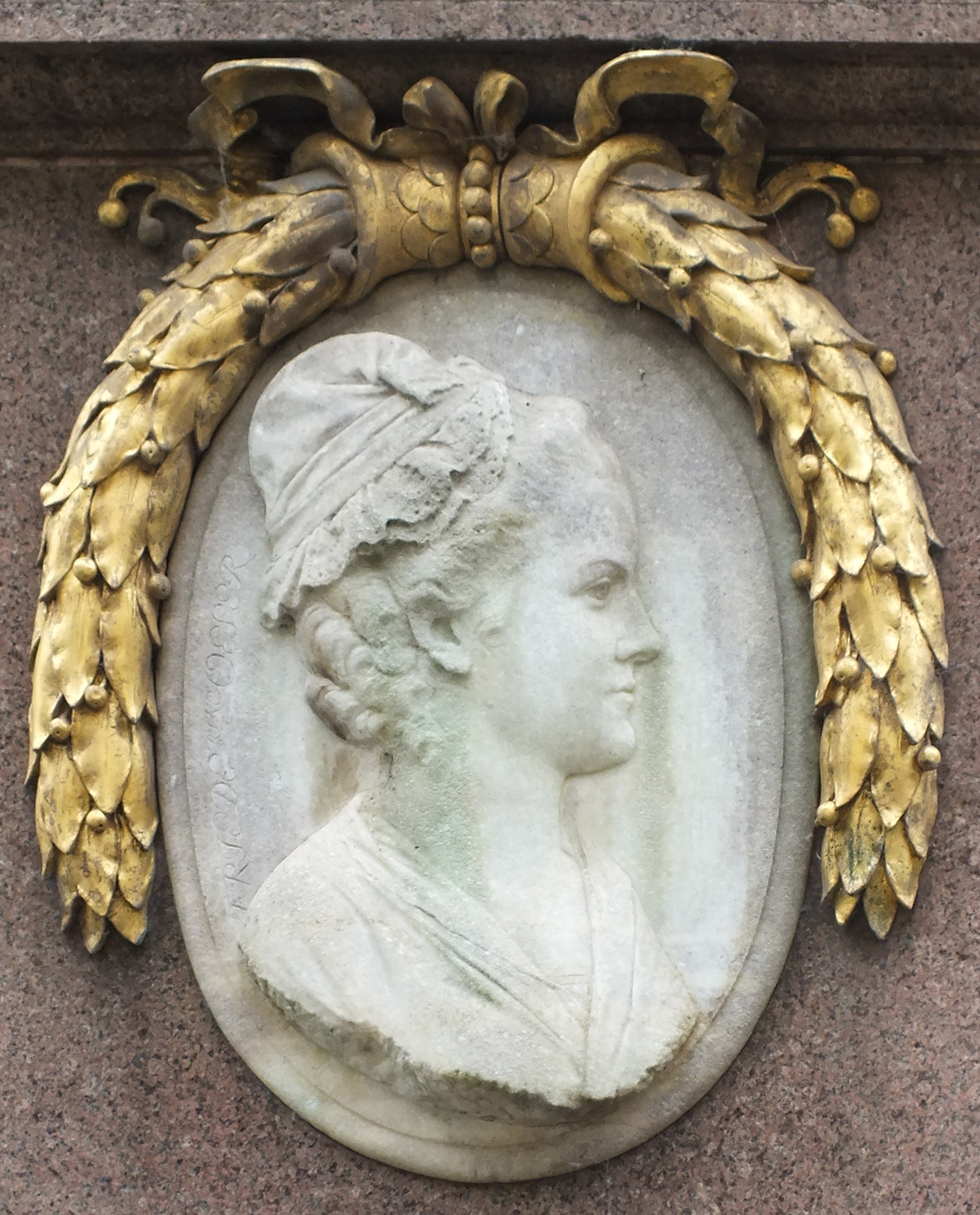
Friederike Oeser

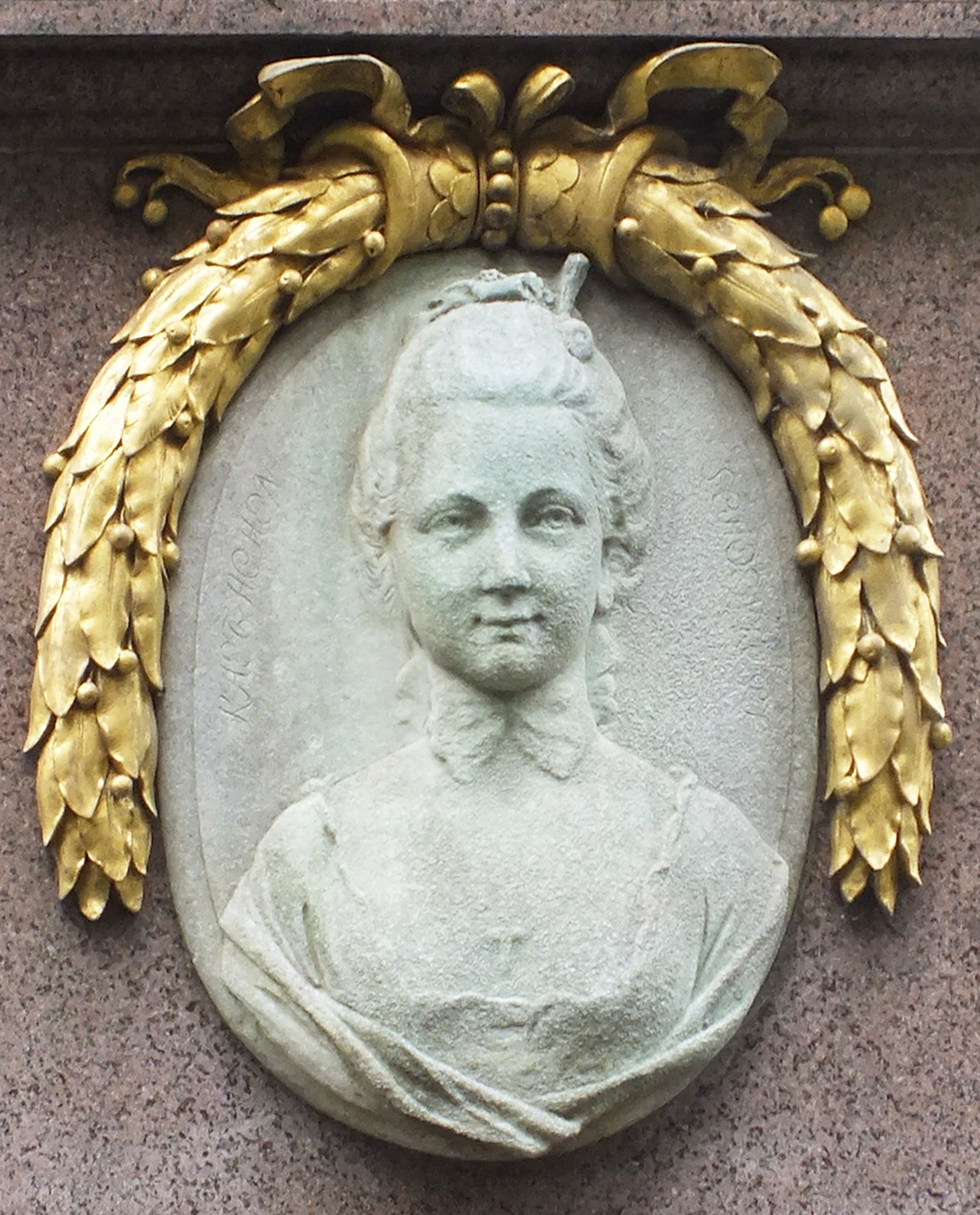
Käthchen Schönkopf

The plinth bears the inscription "Johann Wolfgang Goethe" on the front in a laurel-wreathed gold medallion and "Student in Leipzig 1765–68" on the back.

The sides are decorated with two portraits of girls in relief. On the left, on the west side, you can see Friederike Oeser (1748–1829), the daughter of his Leipzig drawing teacher Adam Friedrich Oeser (1717–1799), with whom Goethe maintained a friendly relationship. The right, eastern side shows Anna Katharina (Käthchen) Schönkopf (1746–1810) in frontal view, the innkeeper's daughter of the inn where Goethe had lunch during his studies in Leipzig, and who was his first great love.

The portraits give the monument fixed local references, and their laurel wreaths, together with that of the front, establish a relationship with the decoration system of the stock exchange façade behind it.

== Restoration ==
The monument was restored in 1985 and then again in 2024. In 2024, among other things, lettering was regilded and the bronze figure and medallions were preserved with microcrystalline wax. The costs amounted to 70,000 euros.

== Bibliography ==
- Cottin, Markus; Klank, Gina; Kretzschmar, Karl-Heinz; Kürschner, Dieter; Petzold, Ilona (1998). Leipziger Denkmale [Leipzig Monuments] (in German). Beucha: Sax Verlag. p. 24-26. ISBN 3-930076-71-3.
- Riedel, Horst (2005). Stadtlexikon Leipzig von A bis Z (in German). Leipzig: Pro Leipzig. p. 188. ISBN 3-936508-03-8.
