= Anna Katharina Schönkopf =

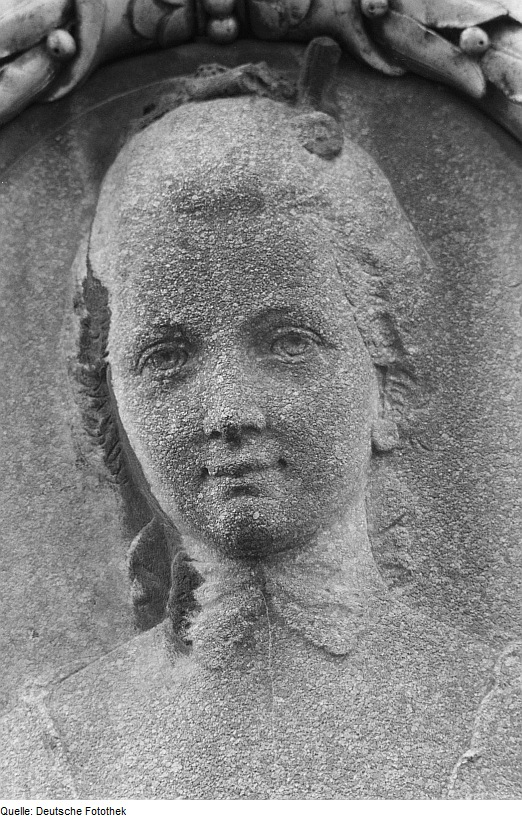
Käthchen Schönkopf on the socle of the Leipzig Goethe monument

Anna Katharina Schönkopf (pronounced [ˈana kataˈʁiːna ˈʃøːnkɔpf]; 22 August 1746 – 20 May 1810) was the daughter of the pewterer and wine merchant Christian Gottlieb Schönkopf (pronounced [ˈkʁɪsti̯a(ː)n ˈɡɔtliːp -]; 1716–1791) and his wife Katharina Sibylla (pronounced [zyˈbɪla]; née Hauck [ˈhaʊk]; 1714–1790). The young Johann Wolfgang Goethe, who studied in Leipzig from 1765 to 1768, fell in love with her in 1766.

== Käthchen Schönkopf as a figure in Goethe's life ==
Anna Katharina, who moved to her parents' hotel in 1766, was three years older than Goethe. She reacted rather reservedly to his declarations of love in the beginning. Her parents were kept in the dark about the unfolding love-affair, because a liaison of a girl of Anna Katharina's plain origin and the son of a patrician family might be seen as unsuitable to Goethe's station. Goethe communicated his wishes and feelings to his friend Ernst Wolfgang Behrisch (1738–1809), and sought Behrisch's advice in the issue. He felt strong jealousy of real or imaginary rivals, during his relationship to Käthchen, and wrought the inner problems connected to this into his pastoral play Die Laune des Verliebten (The Lover’s Caprice, 1768), to cure himself.

Anna Katharina appeared to Goethe as a perfect, charming and elegant being. She liked the love poems which Goethe dedicated to her and which he published as Annettenlieder (songs to Annette). These poems are considered the first of bigger meaning within Goethe's oeuvre.

Goethe introduced the jurist and later vice mayor of Leipzig, Christian Karl Kanne, who would later become Anna Katharina's bridegroom, to his sweetheart. He continued his friendship with Anna Katharina by sending her letters, in which he still felt bound to her, until 1770. Kanne and Anna Katharina married in 1770. Goethe visited Anna Katharina in 1776, when he had moved to Weimar.
