= Old Town Hall (Leipzig) =

Town hall in Leipzig, Germany

Coordinates: 51°20′25.11″N 12°22′31.37″E

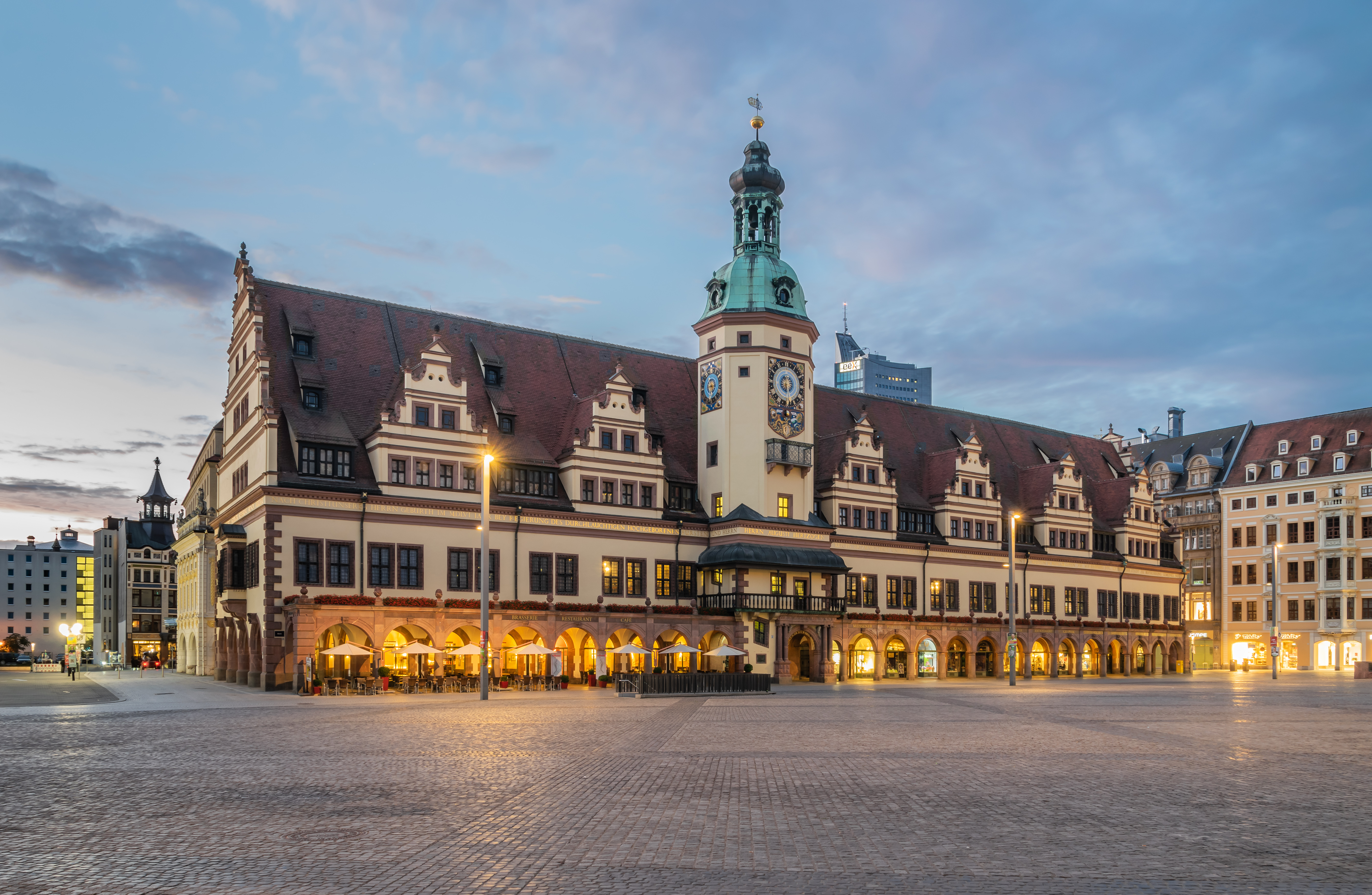
Old Town Hall, seen from the marketplace, 2019

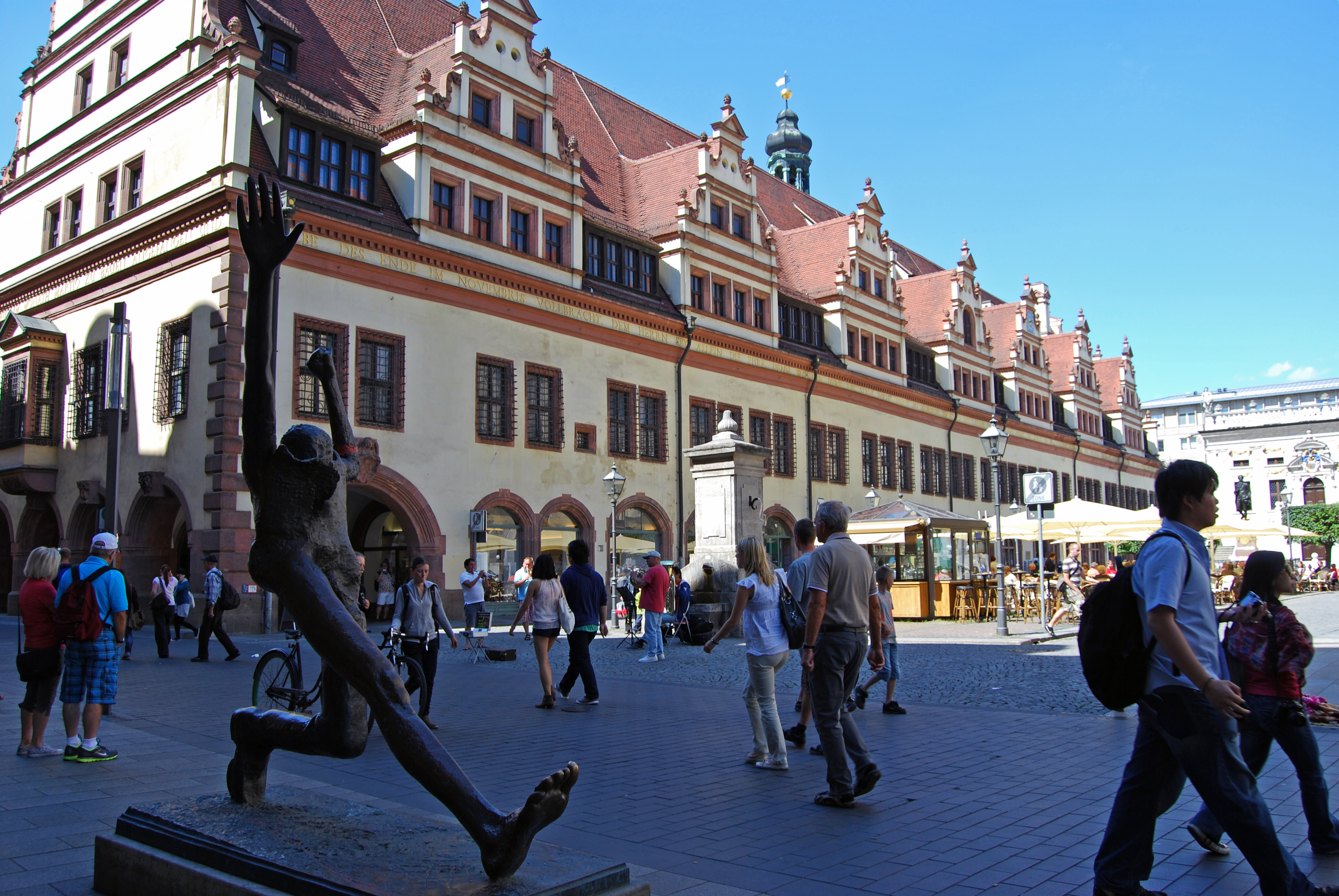
Old Town Hall, seen from the Naschmarkt side, 2012

The Old Town Hall (German: Altes Rathaus), which dominates the east side of the Markt square in Leipzig's district Mitte, is considered one of Germany's most important secular Renaissance buildings. At the rear is the Naschmarkt (Sweet market). The mayor and the municipal administration have been housed in the New Town Hall since 1905.

== Description ==
The Old Town Hall is a landmark of Leipzig and is generally considered to be an extremely beautiful building. The impression of beauty comes from length, colour, uniformity, and proportions. With two storeys and a length of more than 300 feet, the building would be long but not high, if there would not be the steep roof. The eaves edge is low, so the roof contributes significantly to the height. As far as its effect is concerned, it is receded into the background by the row of wall dormers (6 on the Marktplatz side, 7 on the Naschmarkt side) with their connecting horizontal lines. Compared to the length, the width of the house is also relatively small. The high staggered gables on the narrow sides are emphasized by strong horizontal cornices which is typical for that time in Saxony. The stone arcade on the market side, built between 1906 and 1909 and continuing on the narrow sides, represents another strong horizontal element. The elongated structure is interrupted by the octagonal stair tower, which stands on the market side next to the main portal, through which a passage from the market to the Naschmarkt is possible. Only two colors are used in total: the warm color tone of the Rochlitz porphyry and a matching beige or ocher tone for the wall plaster. The main portal is supported by two Ionic columns and flanked with so-called gaff heads (in German: Gaffkopf), which are supposed to represent the master builders. At second glance one discovers numerous other details such as the stone box oriels on the two gable ends, designed keystones, ornamental fountains, all kinds of commemorative plaques and finally a mullion on the south side. This is dated to 1230 and comes from a previous building, probably a tower house.

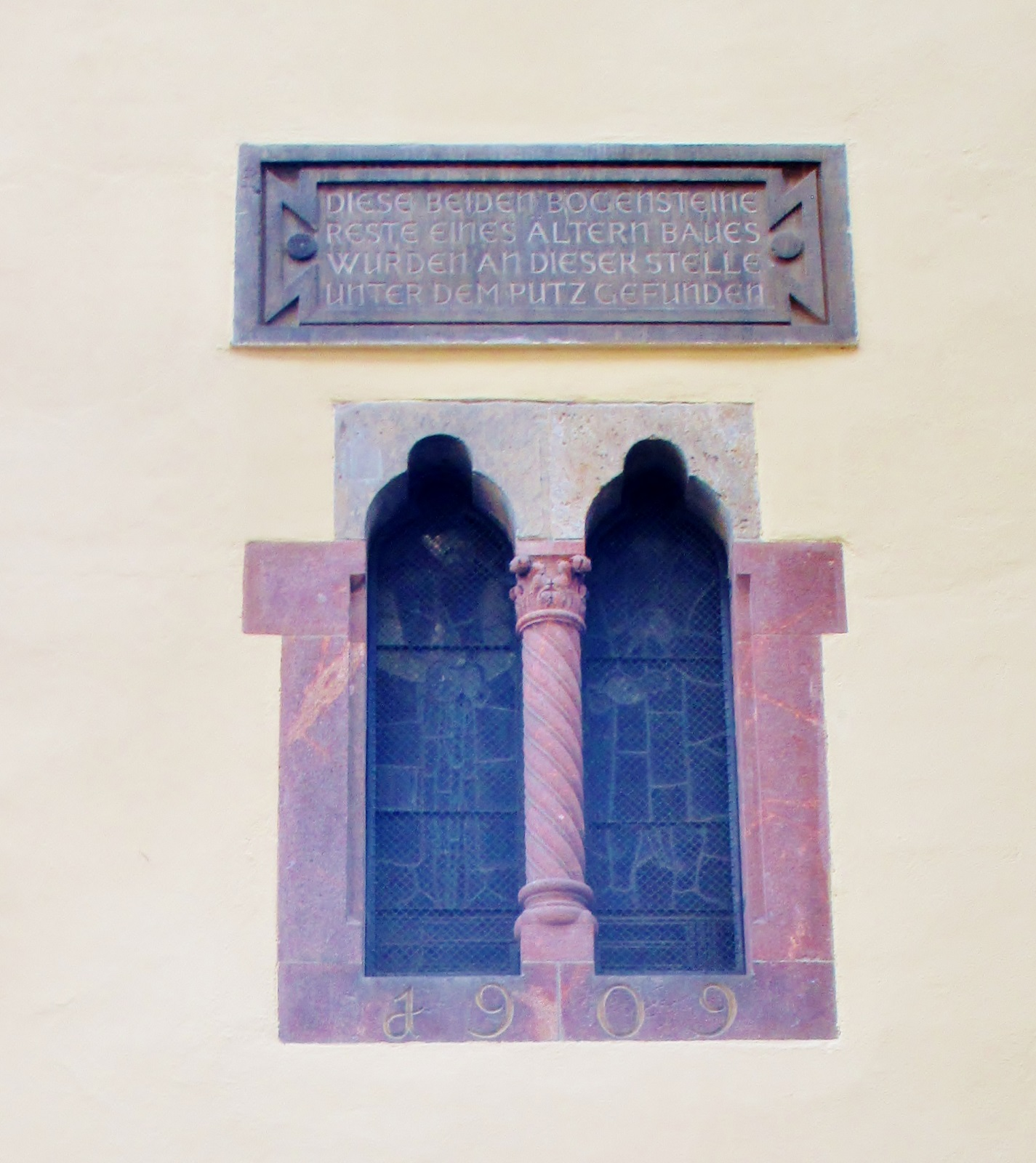
Component from the year 1230

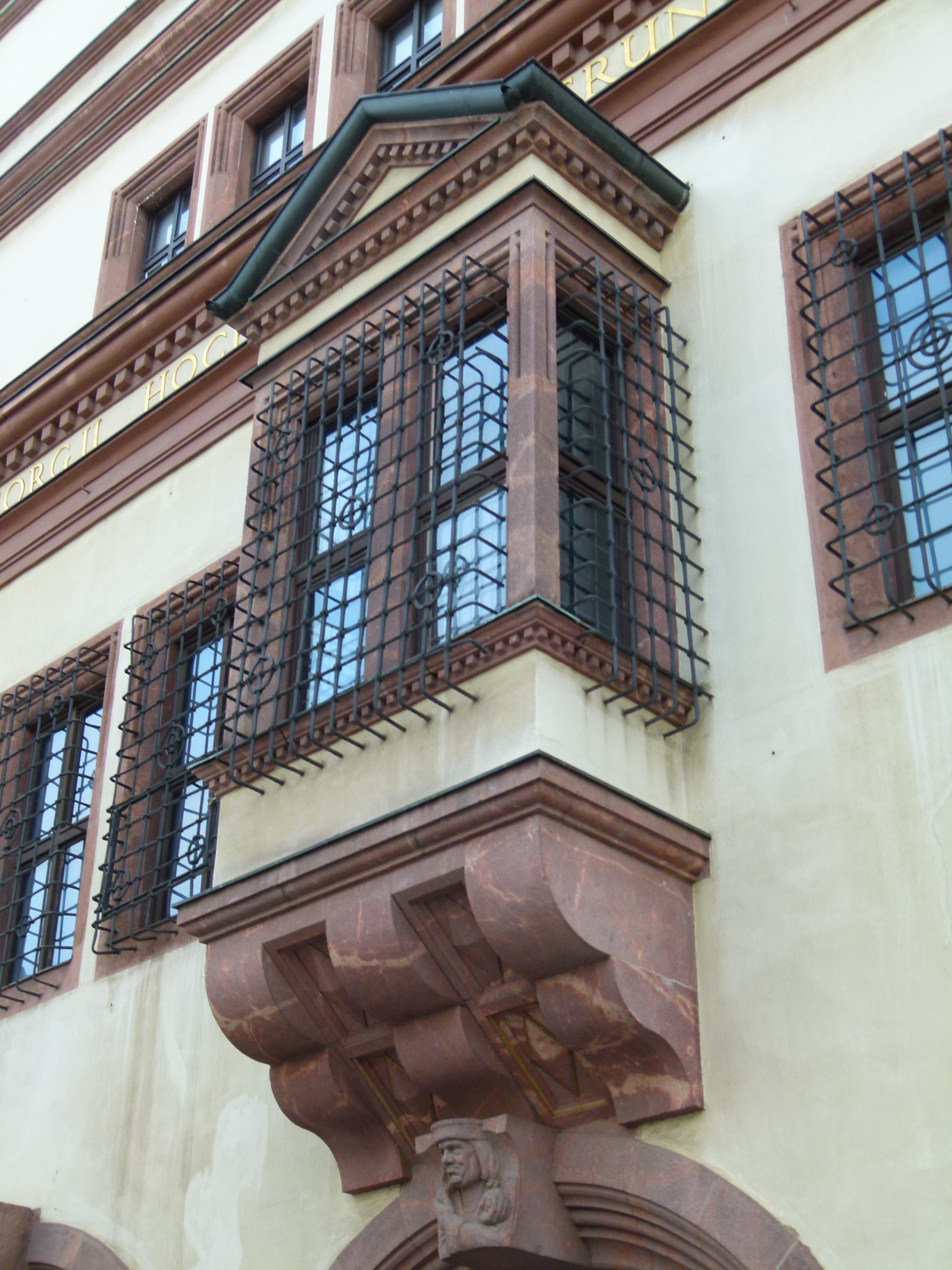
Stone box oriel

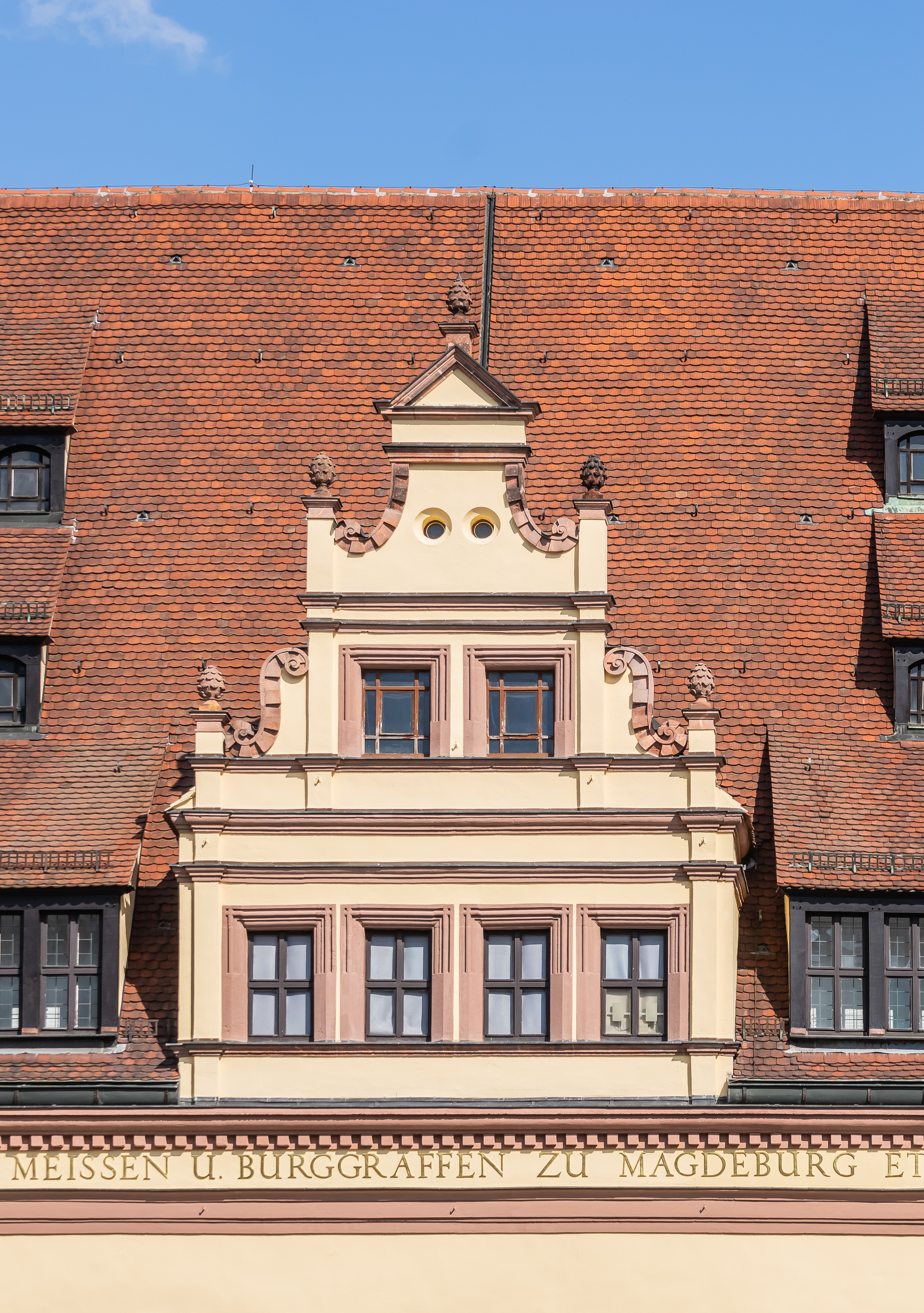
Wall dormer

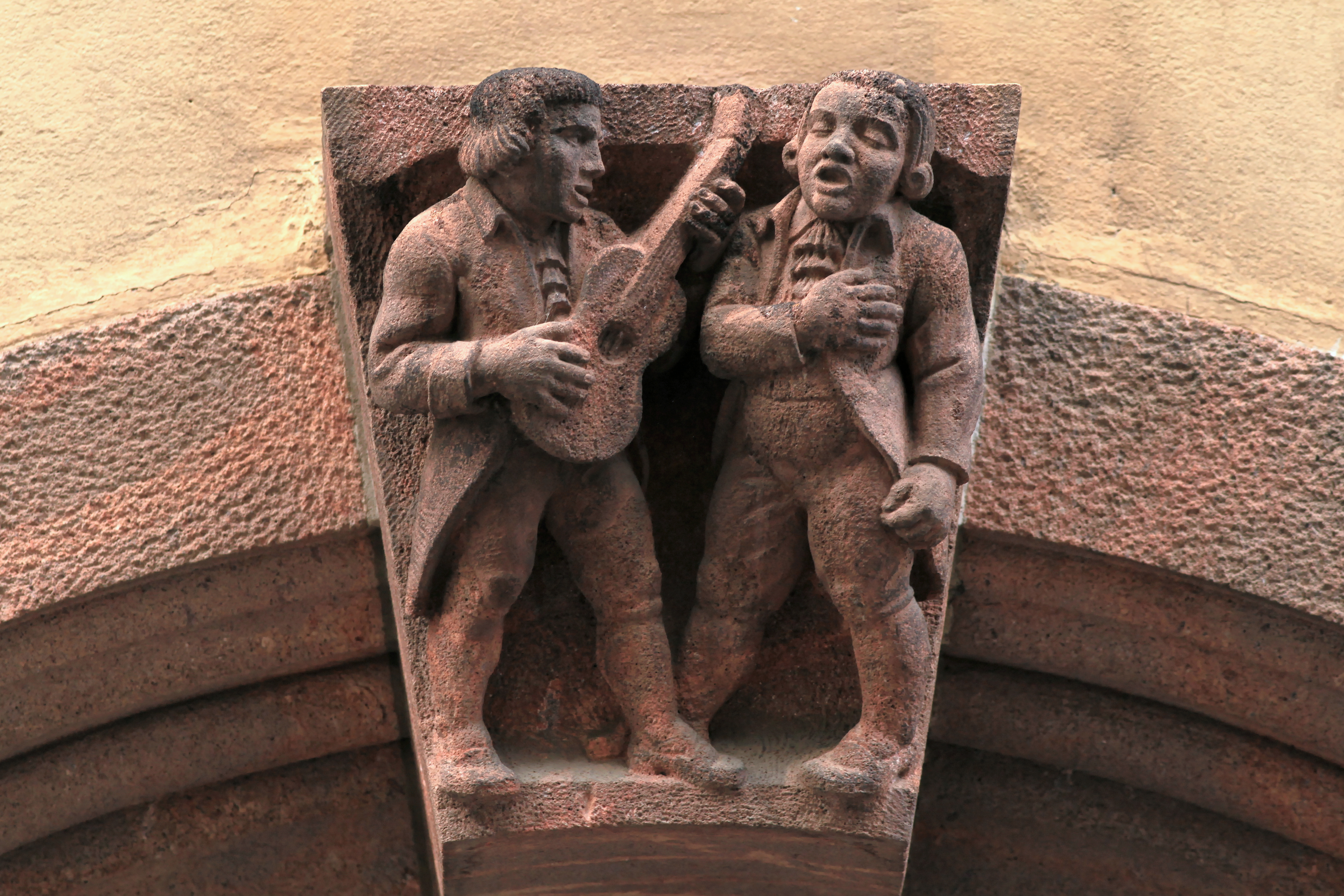
Keystone in an arch

For all its symmetry, it is worth noting that the building has surprising asymmetrical elements, see below. According to Wolfgang Hocquél, such asymmetries are a hallmark of the German Renaissance. The Old Town Hall is essentially a Renaissance building that dates back to 1556. Some additions were made during the Baroque period and then again from 1906 to 1909. Parts of previous buildings were also reused.

== History ==
=== Antecedent buildings ===
In 1341, Frederick II, Margrave of Meissen, offered the Leipzig mercers a representative building south of the market, probably built in the Romanesque style at the end of the 13th century. This building corresponded approximately, in its location and size, to the current council chamber (Ratsstube) of the old town hall. Presumably, the city council was already exercising its functions here. The Leipzig Town Hall is mentioned for the first time in a document from 1360. Due to the growth of Leipzig and the consequent increase in the tasks of the city council, extensions were carried out on the north side of the Tuchhaus (Cloth hall). The two new buildings, which initially extended to the current passage, were erected on the foundations of the previous buildings, which also explains the "bend" of about three degrees in the longitudinal façade of the town hall between the first and the second wall dormer from the right.

In the middle of the 15th century, it was connected to two other buildings north of the current passage. In December 1467, a new council chamber was completed. The construction of a stair tower above the passage and therefore the final fusion of the different buildings cannot be traced precisely. A stair tower is mentioned for the first time in 1476. The mercers moved into their own building in 1482. A year later, a secret room was created, which is a kind of mezzanine and can be visited today as the Aerar (treasure). In 1498, trade was flourishing at the time, it was decided to rebuild the town hall, but this became financially impossible.

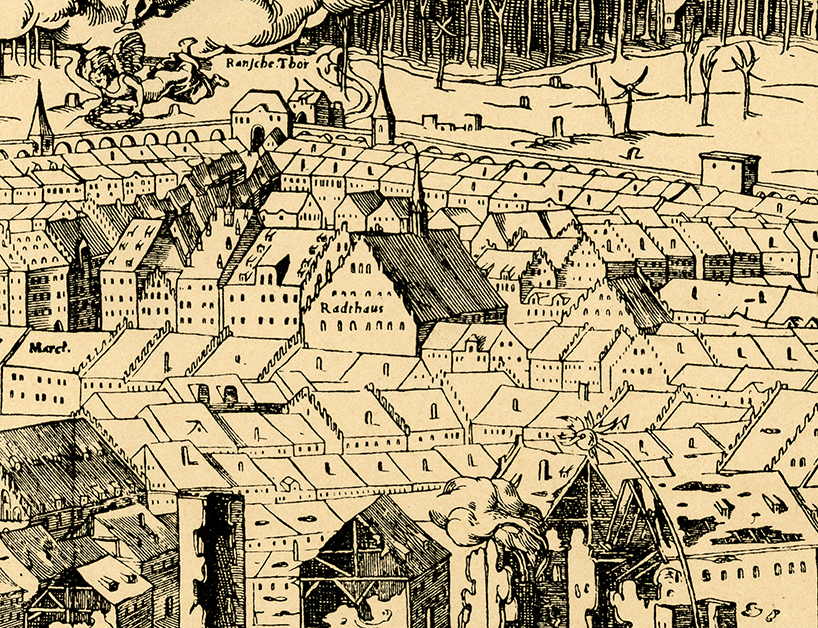
View of the previous town hall, 1547

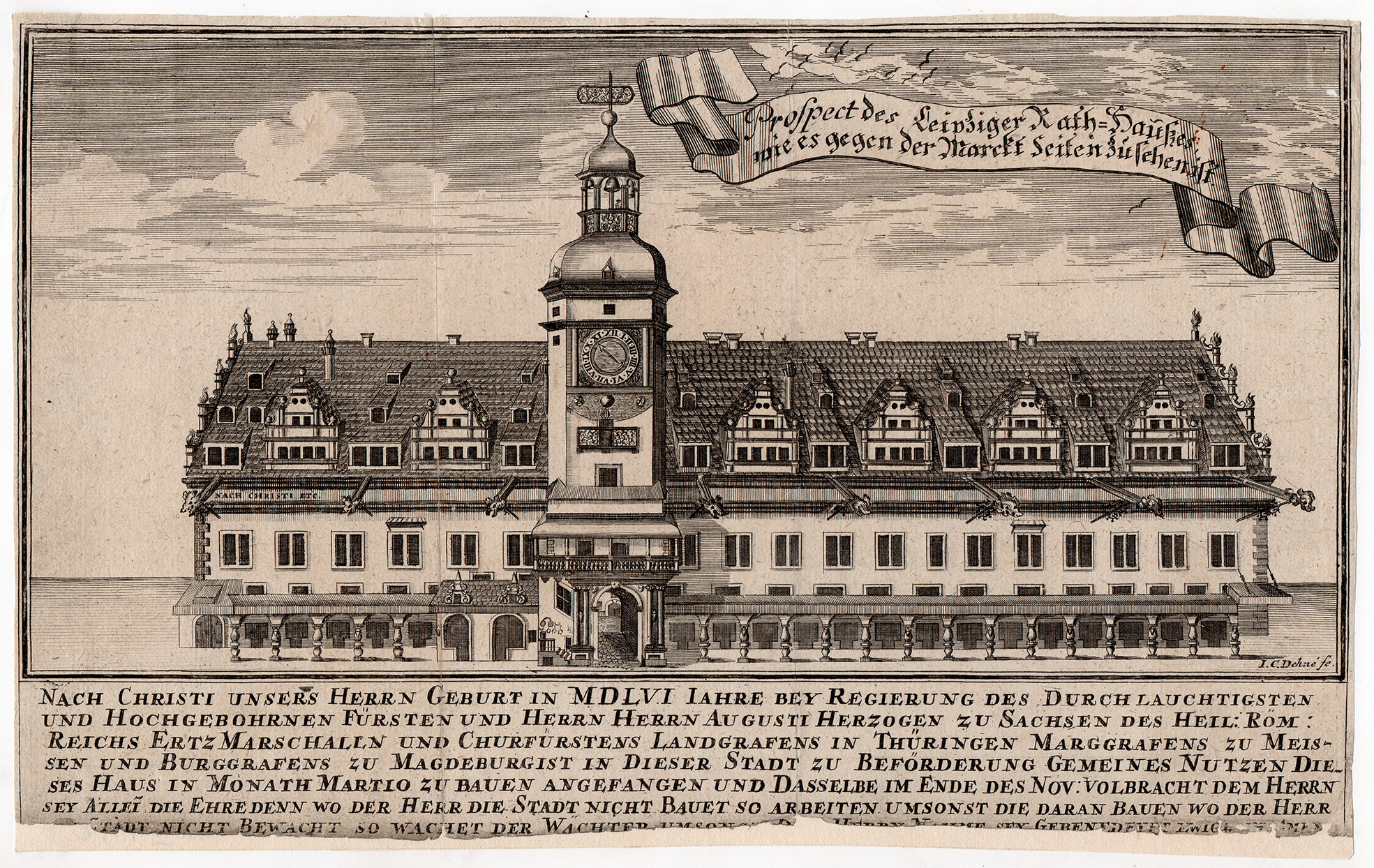
Old town hall, 1672

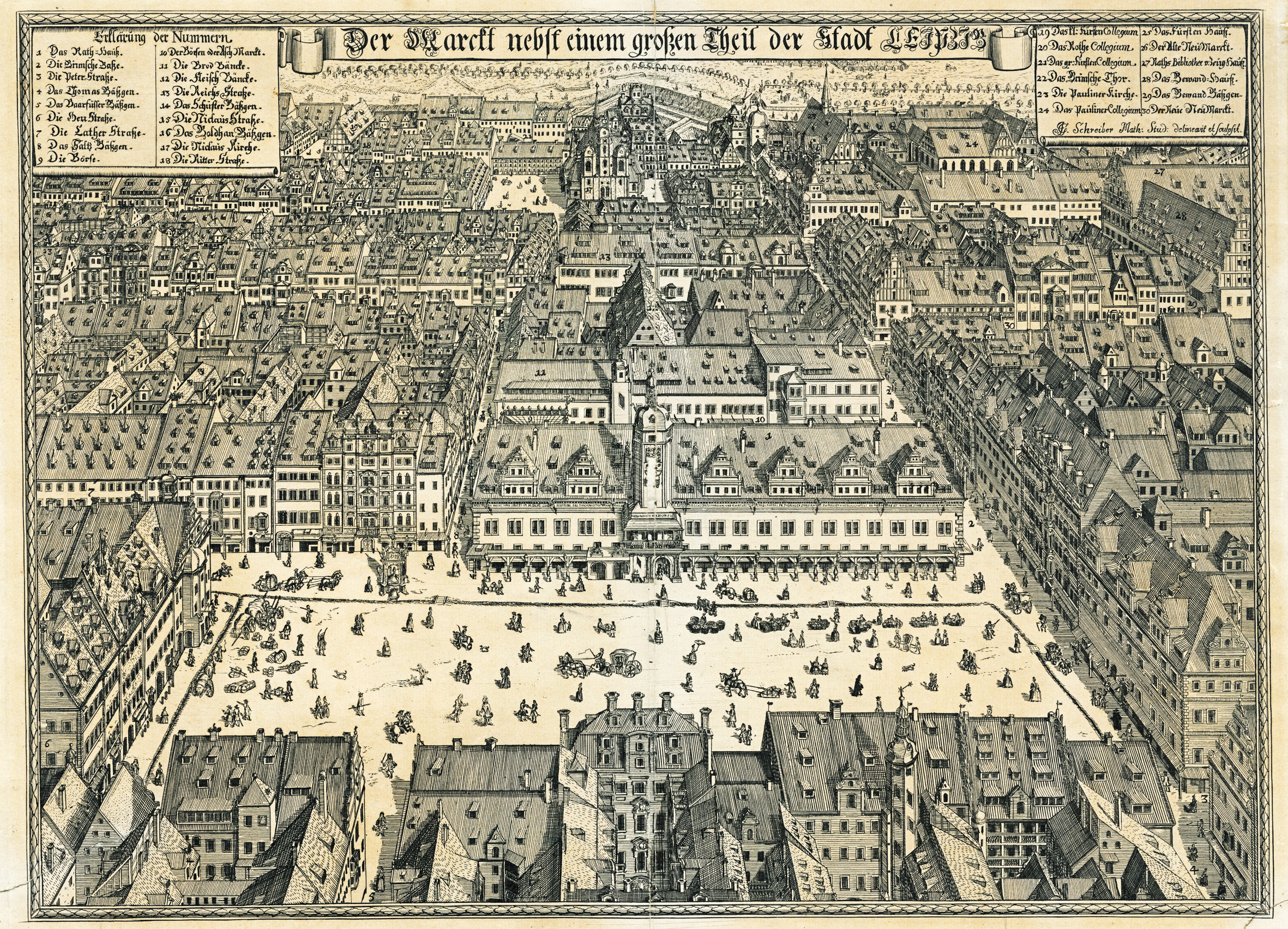
The marketplace of Leipzig with the old town hall, 1712

=== Construction of the old town hall in 1556/57 ===
Until the middle of the 16th century, there were fundamental structural changes, for example the town hall was widened by about four meters (13 feet) in the direction of the Naschmarkt, accompanied by an enlargement and elevation of the roof. The town hall was rebuilt in 1556/57 by the reigning mayor and major merchant Hieronymus Lotter and thus largely acquired its current exterior appearance in the Saxon Renaissance style. The first site manager was Paul Speck, to whom the design can probably attributed. He was followed by the master Paul Widemann after his death in early 1557. The town's master mason, Sittich Pfretzschner, was also involved.

In addition to being the seat of the councillors, the old town hall also houses the Upper Court of Leipzig and the Court of Aldermen, the magistrate of the city, the archives of the council and prison cells housed in the cellar from the end of the 16th century. The ceremonial hall, with a length of about 40 m (131 ft.) was for a long time the largest event venue of the city and was therefore also used for public receptions and festivities.

Hans Krell's paintings of Saxon princes, which have been in the ceremonial hall and the council chamber since 1553, were continually being completed.

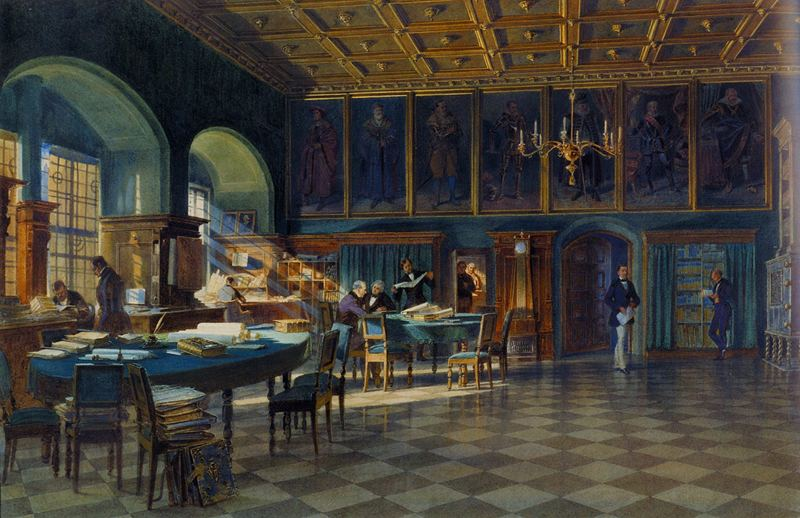
Painting of the council chamber, 1858

=== Posterior alterations and additions ===
From the 18th century, there was talk of increasing the height of the building. Finally, only the tower was raised by 2.80 m (9.2 ft.) by the master builder Christian Döring in Baroque style. At the end of the 19th century, the town hall finally proved too small for the booming city. Decades of discussions followed about demolishing the building and rebuilding it on the same site, or even selling the land for the construction of commercial buildings. The new town hall was finally built from 1899 on the place of the Pleissenburg. The preservation of the old town hall was decided in 1905 with a tie by the vote of the city council's president, Johannes Junck. After extensive renovations, it is to serve as the Leipzig City History Museum.

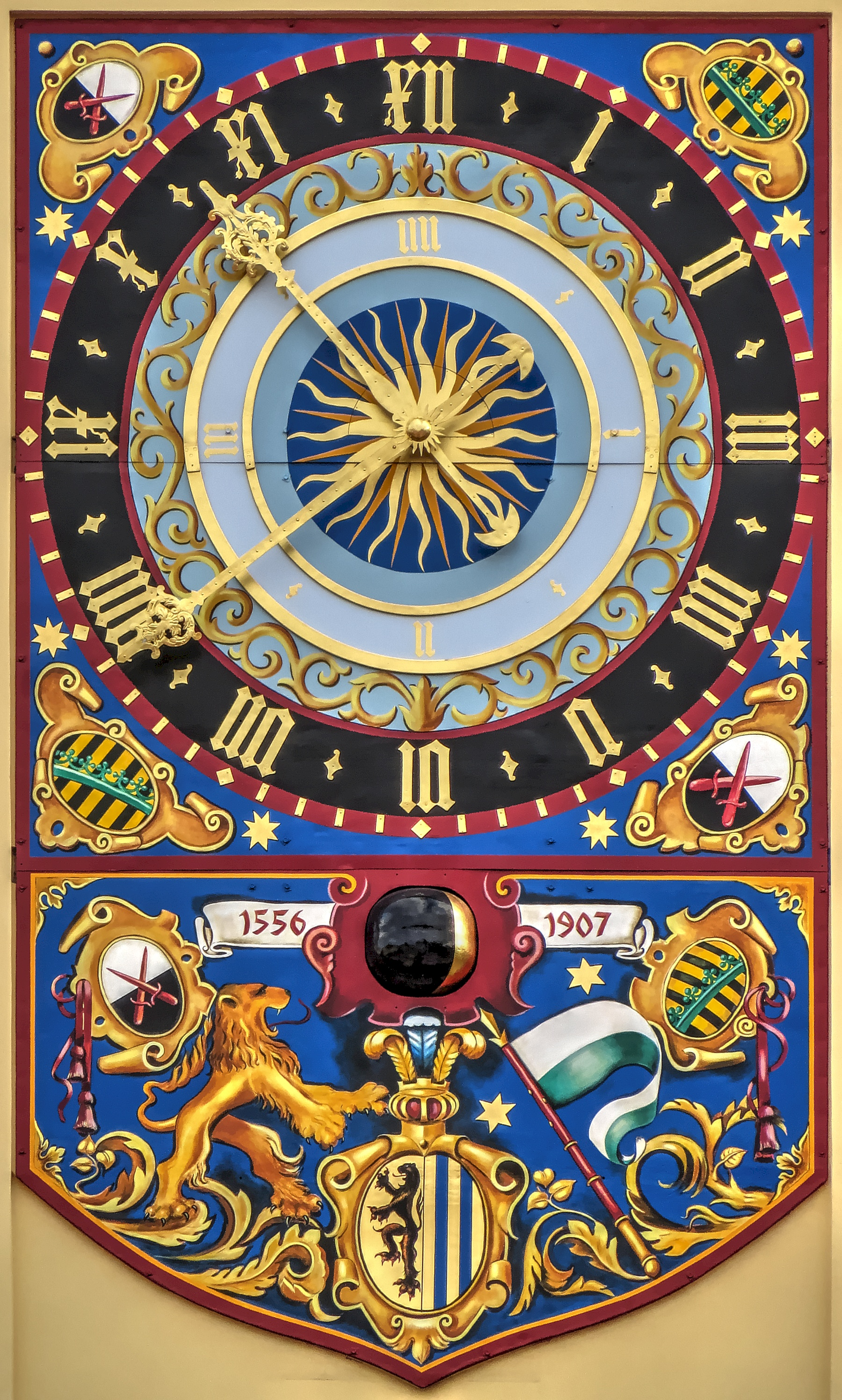
Astronomical clock at the western side of the tower after renovation 2018

Restoration and reconstruction work for the new use of a museum took place from 1906 to 1909 under the direction of Otto Wilhelm Scharenberg, the current exterior is largely a remodeling of these conversions. At the same time, a porphyry arcade by Rochlitz was created on the ground floor, on the side of the marketplace, instead of wooden sales arbors. Since then, there are two fountains "Badender Knabe" and "Badendes Mädchen" in a niche inside and in front of the passage on the side of the Naschmarkt.

During World War II, the building was badly damaged during the air raid on Leipzig on 4 December 1943, and the roof structure burnt to the ground. The concrete ceiling supported by iron, which was installed during renovation work in the early twentieth century, prevented flames from spreading from the roof structure to the historic rooms on the first floor. Most of the museum's contents had already been moved before and were preserved. The reconstruction took place from 1946 to 1950 and was one of the first of a public building in Leipzig. After small exhibitions from 1945, the city's history museum and thus the old town hall reopened in 1952.

From 1988 to 1990, the building was closed due to extensive renovation. From the beginning of 2017 to 2018, the façade including the dials of the two clocks was extensively renovated.

Inside the building, one should especially see the large ceremonial hall, the council chamber, the landscape room in late Baroque style, the treasury and the only authentic portrait of Johann Sebastian Bach by Elias Gottlob Haussmann), who signed his certificate of employment as cantor at St. Thomas in the council chamber in 1723. To point out is also the scale model of the city of Leipzig of 1823, made by Johann Christoph Merzdorf.

== The old town hall and the golden ratio ==
What is remarkable is the asymmetrical structure of the building from the front and back, roughly dividing it into golden ratio. During the transformations carried out by Hieronymus Lotter in 1556/57, the existing buildings and their foundations gave the façade its current dimensions. It is often assumed that the tower of the old town hall, which is shifted laterally to the left, marks the proportions of the golden ratio of the building. However, the current division of the building front towards the marketplace in terms of golden ration is constituted by the center of the main portal and passage, located asymmetrically with respect to the tower. The overall aesthetic impression of the building is not affected by this fact related to the height of the tower.

== Circumferential inscription ==
This text in the German language, with some interspersed Latin, can be read all around the town hall below the top floor:

"NACH CHRISTI UNSERES HERRN GEBURTH IM MDLVI IAHR BEY REGIERUNG DES DURCHLAUCHTIGSTEN UND HOCHGEBORENEN FURSTEN UND HERRN AUGUSTI HERTZOGEN ZU SACHSEN DES H. ROM REICHS ERTZMARSCHALL UND CHURFÜRSTEN LANDGRAFF IN THÜRINGEN MARGGRAFFEN ZU MEISSEN U. BURGGRAFFEN ZU MAGDEBURG ETC. IST INDISER STADT ZU BEFÖRDERUNG GEMEINES NUTZENS DIESES HAUS IM MONATH MARTIO ZU BAUEN ANGEFANGEN UND DASSELBE DES ENDE IM NOVEMBRIS VOLLBRACHT. DEM HERRN SEY ALLEIN DIE EHRE, DENN WO DER HERR DIE STADT NICHT BAUET SO ARBEITEN UMSONST DIE DARAN BAUEN WO DER HERR DIE STADT NICHT BEWACHET SO WACHET DER WÄCHTER UMSONST DES HERRN NAHME SEY GEBENEDEYET EWIGLICH AMEN BEY CHURF. IOH. GEORG II. HOCHLÖBL. REGIERUNG RENOV. MDCLXXII."

That means in English:

"IN THE YEAR MDLVI (1556) AFTER CHRIST OUR LORD'S BIRTH DURING THE REIGN OF THE MOST RIGHTY AND HIGH-BORN PRINCE AND LORD AUGUST I DUKE OF SAXONY OF THE H. ROM EMPIRE ARCHMARSHAL AND ELECTOR LANDGRAVE OF THURINGIA MARGRAVE OF MEISSEN AND BURGRAVE OF MAGDEBURG ETC. IN THIS TOWN IN SPONSORSHIP OF THE COMMON PUBLIC INTEREST BEGUN TO BUILD THIS HOUSE IN MONTH MARTIO AND ACHIEVE THE SAME OF END IN NOVEMBRIS. GLORY TO THE LORD ONLY, FOR WHERE THE LORD DOES NOT BUILD THE CITY THEY WORK IN VAIN WHO BUILD ON IT WHERE THE LORD DOES NOT GUARD THE CITY, THE GUARDIAN WATCHES IN VAIN THE LORD'S NAME SHALL BE BLESSED FOR EVER AMEN BY ELECT. JOHN GEORGE II. HIGHLY PRAISEWORTHY REGNANCY RENOV. MDCLXXII (1672)."

This inscription was painted on in 1672 and later, during renovations at the beginning of the 20th century, refined with the use of brass letters.

In the inscription is praised the short construction time. Rudolf Skoda writes that the house had to be built in the short time between the Spring fair and the Autumn fair. The completion of the interior took place afterward and required much more time.

== Measurements (since 1909) ==
- Total length (on the side of the marketplace): about 93.2 meter (or 306 feet)
- Length of the building's parts on the left side of the passage: about 35.8 m (or 117 ft.) and on the right side of the passage: about 57.4 m (or 188 ft.)
- Broadness: about 20.6 m (or 67,6 ft.)
- Tallness (Tower): about 41 m (or 135 ft.)
- Length of the circumferential inscription: about 220 m (or 722 feet)
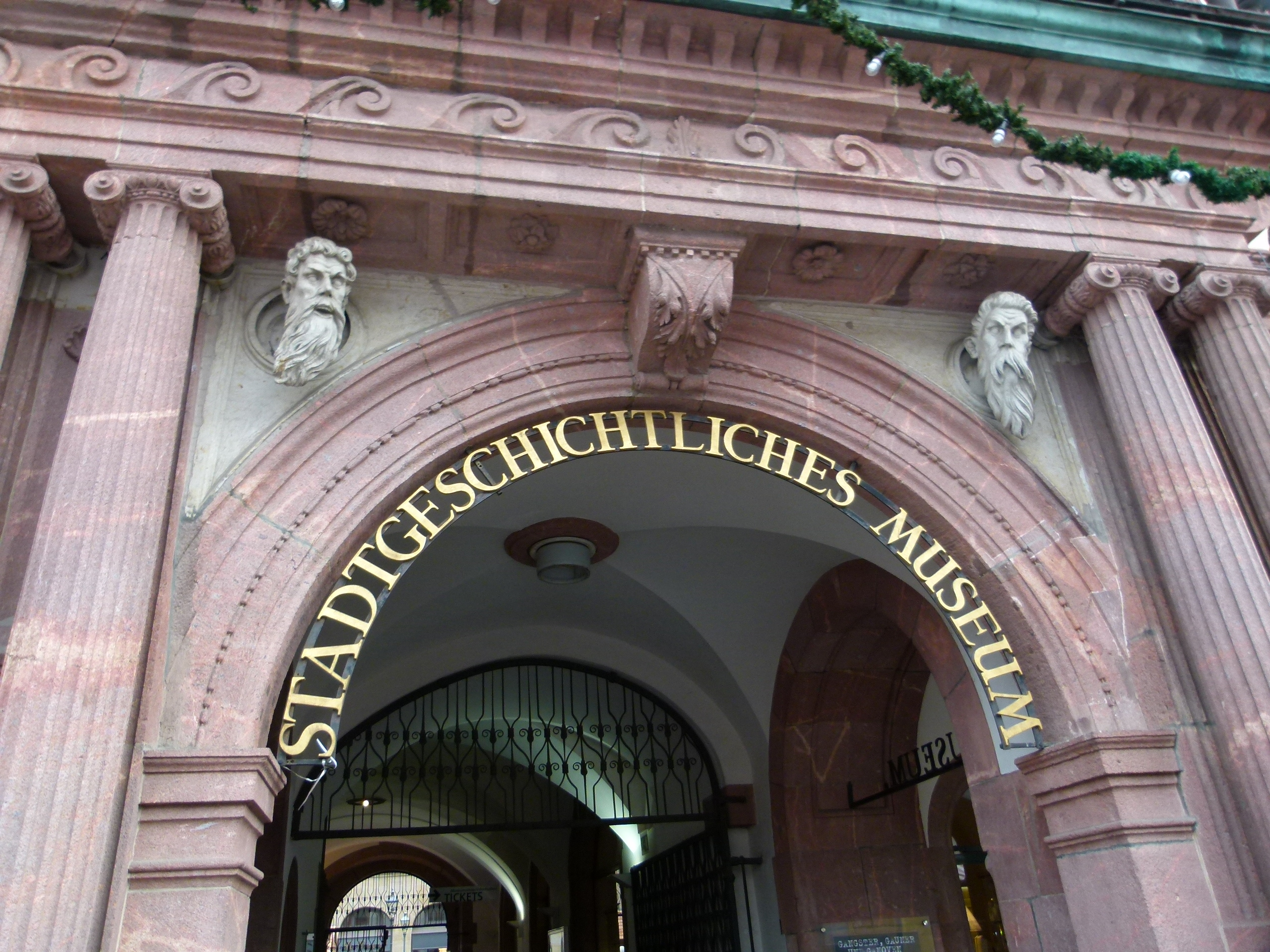
Main portal - Heads of Lotter and Widemann?

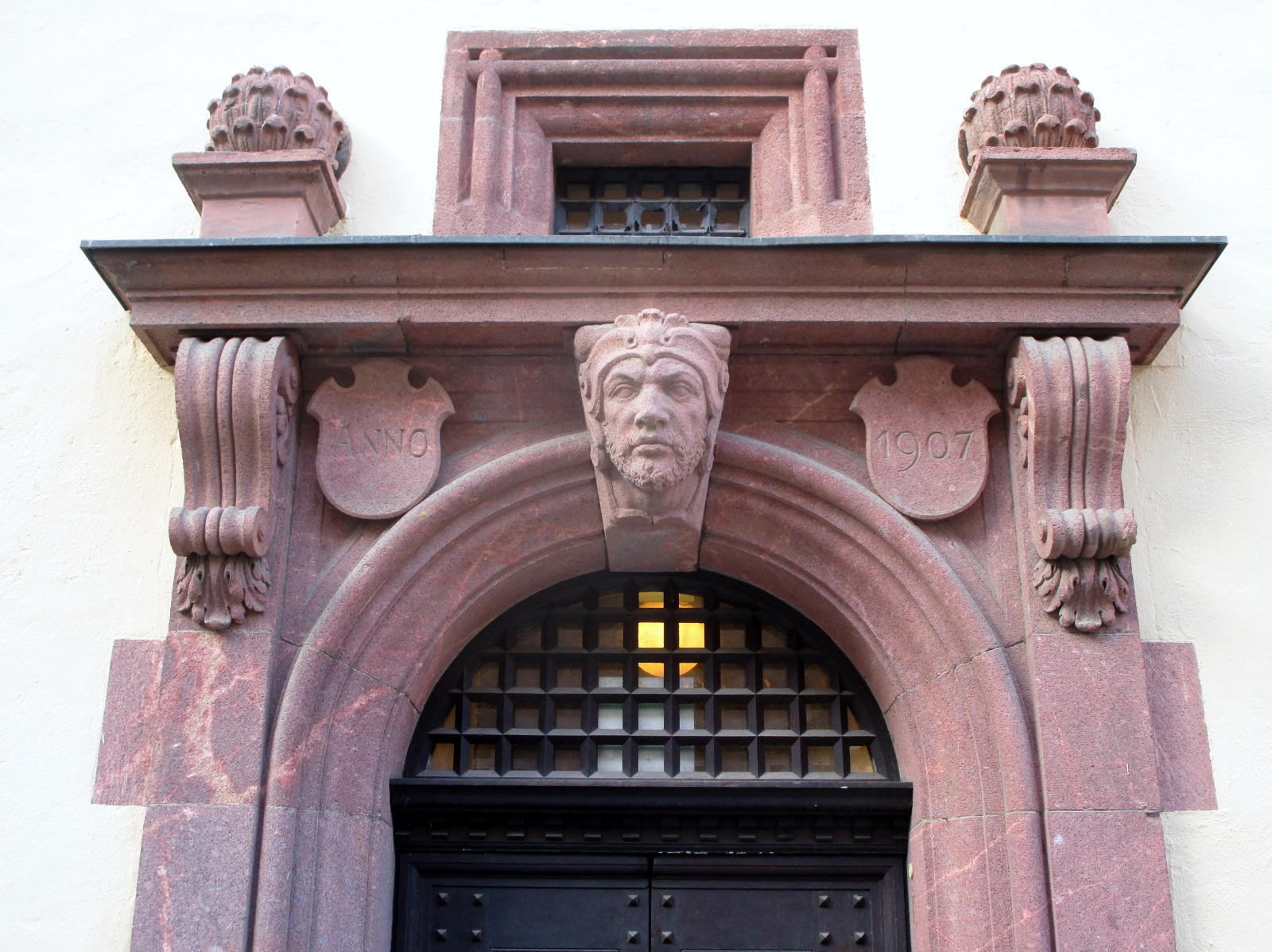
Head of Scharenberg?

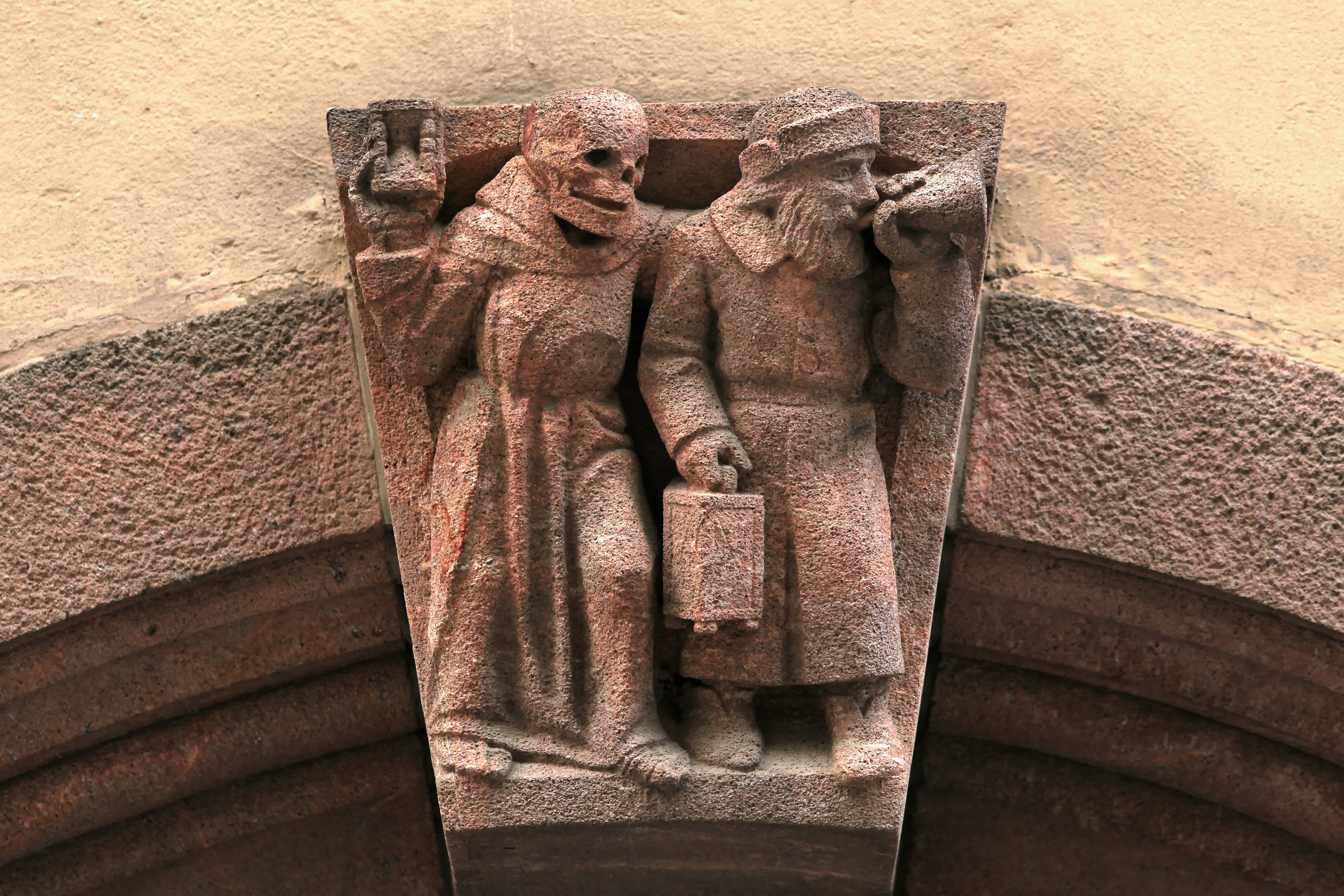
Keystone: Personification of death

== See also ==
- Architecture of Leipzig - Renaissance

== Literature ==
- * Hieronymus Lotter, copy of the document in the tower hood of the old town hall (1573), in: Axel Frey / Bernd Weinkauf (ed.), Leipzig als ein Pleißathen. Eine geistesgeschichtliche Ortsbestimmung, Reclam Verlag, Leipzig 1995, ISBN 3-379-01526-1, p. 255f. (in German)
- Cornelius Gurlitt: Rathhaus. In: Beschreibende Darstellung der älteren Bau- und Kunstdenkmäler des Königreichs Sachsen, 18. Volume: Stadt Leipzig (II. Theil). C. C. Meinhold, Dresden, 1896, p. 308.
- Der Umbau des alten Rathauses zu Leipzig. in: Der Profanbau, vol. 1910, issue 1 (1 January 1910), pp. 1–14, in German
- Rudolf Skoda: Hieronymus Lotter. "Es hat mich Kurfürst Moritz zu einem Baumeister allhier gemacht", in: Vera Hauschild (Ed.), Die großen Leipziger, Insel Verlag Frankfurt am Main / Leipzig 1996, ISBN 3-458-16780-3, pp. 35–46, in German
- Doris Mundus: Das Alte Rathaus in Leipzig. Lehmstedt, Leipzig 2003, ISBN 3-937146-01-6, in German
- Wolfgang Hocquél: Leipzig. Architektur von der Romanik bis zur Gegenwart, Passage, 2. stark erweiterte Auflage, Leipzig 2004, ISBN 3-932900-54-5, pp. 38–41, in German
- Volker Rodekamp (Ed.): Das Alte Rathaus zu Leipzig. DZA, Altenburg 2004, ISBN 3-936300-11-9, in German
- Volker Rodekamp (Ed.): Das Alte Rathaus zu Leipzig. DZA, Altenburg 2004, ISBN 3-936300-11-9, in German
- Volker Rodekamp (Ed.): Leipzig original. Stadtgeschichte vom Mittelalter bis zur Völkerschlacht. Katalog zur Dauerausstellung des Stadtgeschichtlichen Museums im Alten Rathaus, Teil I. DZA, Altenburg 2006, ISBN 978-3-936300-24-6, in German
- Markus Cottin, Doris Mundus (Ed.): 450 Jahre Altes Rathaus zu Leipzig. Sax, Markkleeberg 2010, ISBN 978-3-86729-055-5, in German
- Ringel, Sebastian (2015). Lotter, in: Leipzig! One Thousand Years of History. Leipzig: Author and Edition Leipzig in the Seemann Henschel GmbH & Co. KG. pp. 39–41. ISBN 978-3-361-00710-9.
- Alberto Schwarz: Das Alte Leipzig – Stadtbild und Architektur, Beucha 2018, ISBN 978-3-86729-226-9, in German
