= Promenadenring (Leipzig) =

Municipal landscape park in Germany

Coordinates: 51.3406°N 12.3761°E

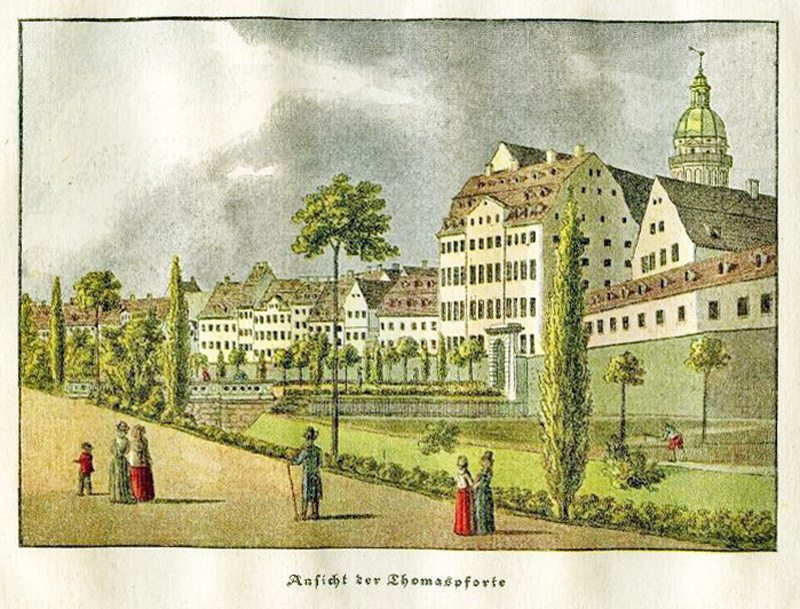
The promenade next to St. Thomas portal (1800)

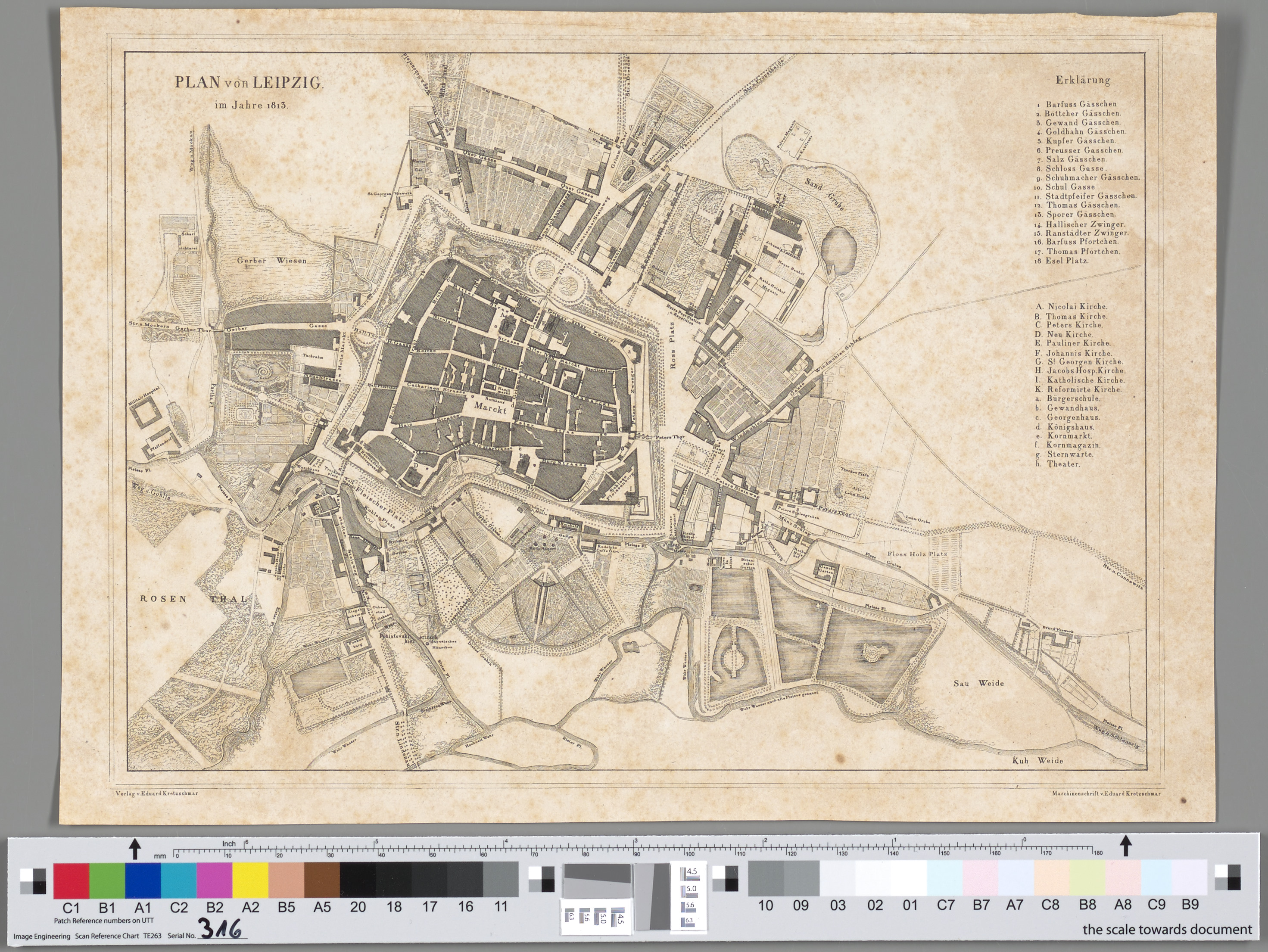
Map of Leipzig (1813), having east at the top, with cognizable Promenadenring

The Promenadenring Leipzig (Ring of promenades) is the oldest municipal landscape park in Germany and one of the most important garden and cultural monuments in the city. The term is also used as a synonym for Leipzig's inner city ring road, a traffic facility that is connected to the green spaces of the Promenadenring. Like the inner city ring road, the promenade ring is about 3.6 kilometers long (2.24 mi.).

== History ==
=== From 1701 until 1777 ===
Even during the tenure of Mayor Franz Romanus (1671-1741), the city's fortification ring had become too narrow and people pushed outside. The first part of the promenade with the so-called Muhmenplatz (Place of nannies) was created between the St. Thomas portal (Thomaspforte) and the Barfusser portal in the west of the city's fortification. When the fortifications proved to be militarily pointless in the Seven Years' War, the sovereign was prepared in 1763 to hand them over to the city. Within a very short time, a ring of promenades was created around the entire city.

=== From 1777 until 1816 ===
During the tenure of Mayor Carl Wilhelm Müller (1728-1801), the first facilities were landscaped in an "English style". The Lower and Upper Parks were created in the north-eastern area of the Promenadenring. Mayor Müller worked with Johann Carl Friedrich Dauthe (1749-1816) as council architect. "The outer end of the promenade, which was planted with numerous rare trees and had plenty of seating, formed a wide avenue for pedestrians, which in turn was bordered by a road."

=== From 1816 until 1900 ===
After the devastation of the Battle of Leipzig, the promenade ring was quickly repaired. The next leap in development took place during the tenure of Mayor Otto Koch (1810-1876). From 1857 until 1859 the Lenné plant was created in the southeastern area of the Promenadenring. The city hired Carl Otto Wittenberg (1834–1918) as the new council gardener, recommended by Lenné, the royal Prussian garden director.

=== Since 1900 ===
Wittenberg retired in 1900. His successor was Carl Hampel, who came from Berlin and whose first major task was the revision of the promenade greenery in the area of the newly built New Town Hall (1905) and then in the area of the newly built Central Station (from 1910). In 1920 Hampel handed over the official business to his successor, Nikolaus Molzen. In the years that followed, traffic development and finally the World War II took their toll. Despite the losses, the Promenadenring has, according to Kathrin Franz, "maintained its outstanding position as an important cultural monument".

== Tour ==
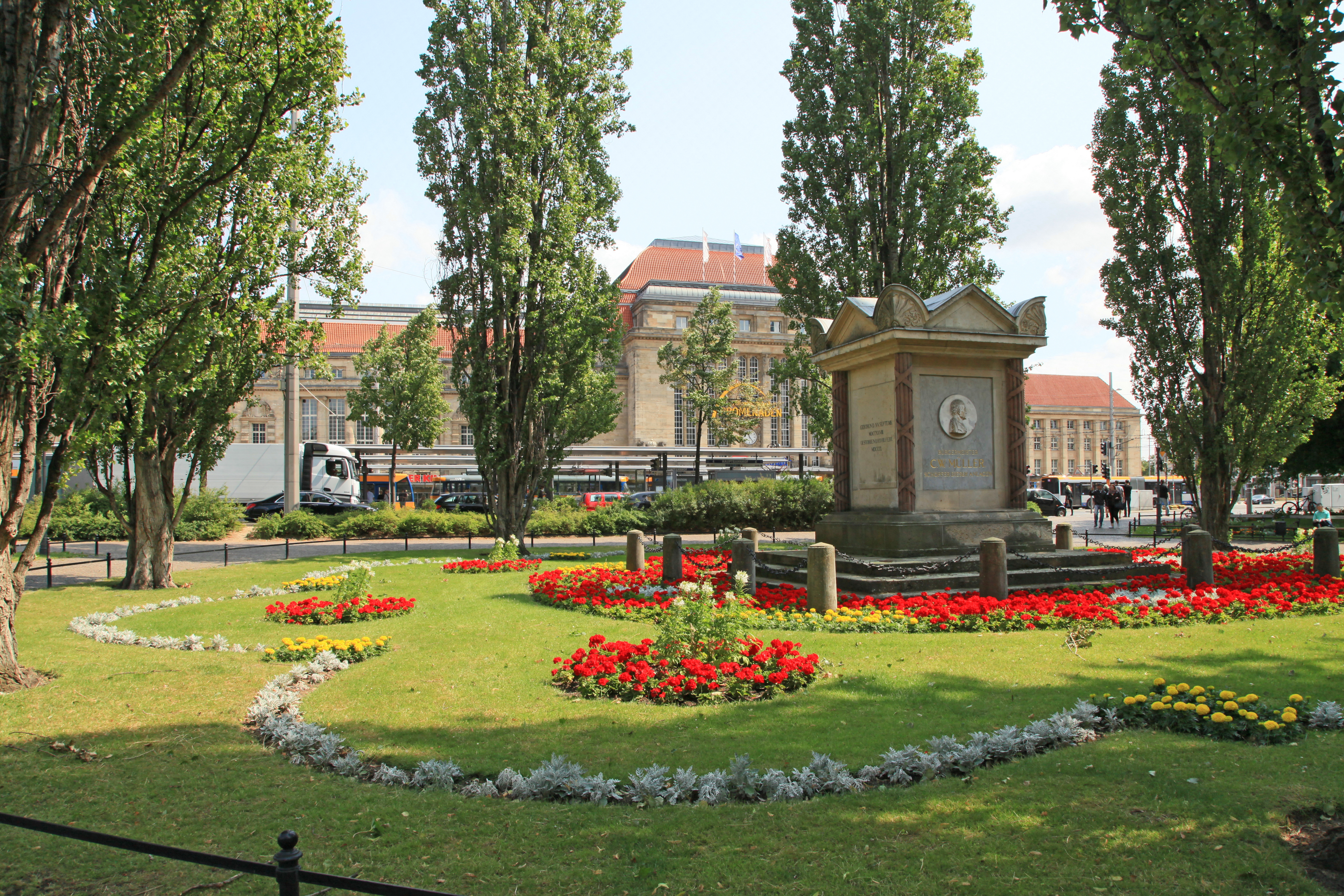
Memorial to mayor Müller in the Lower Park

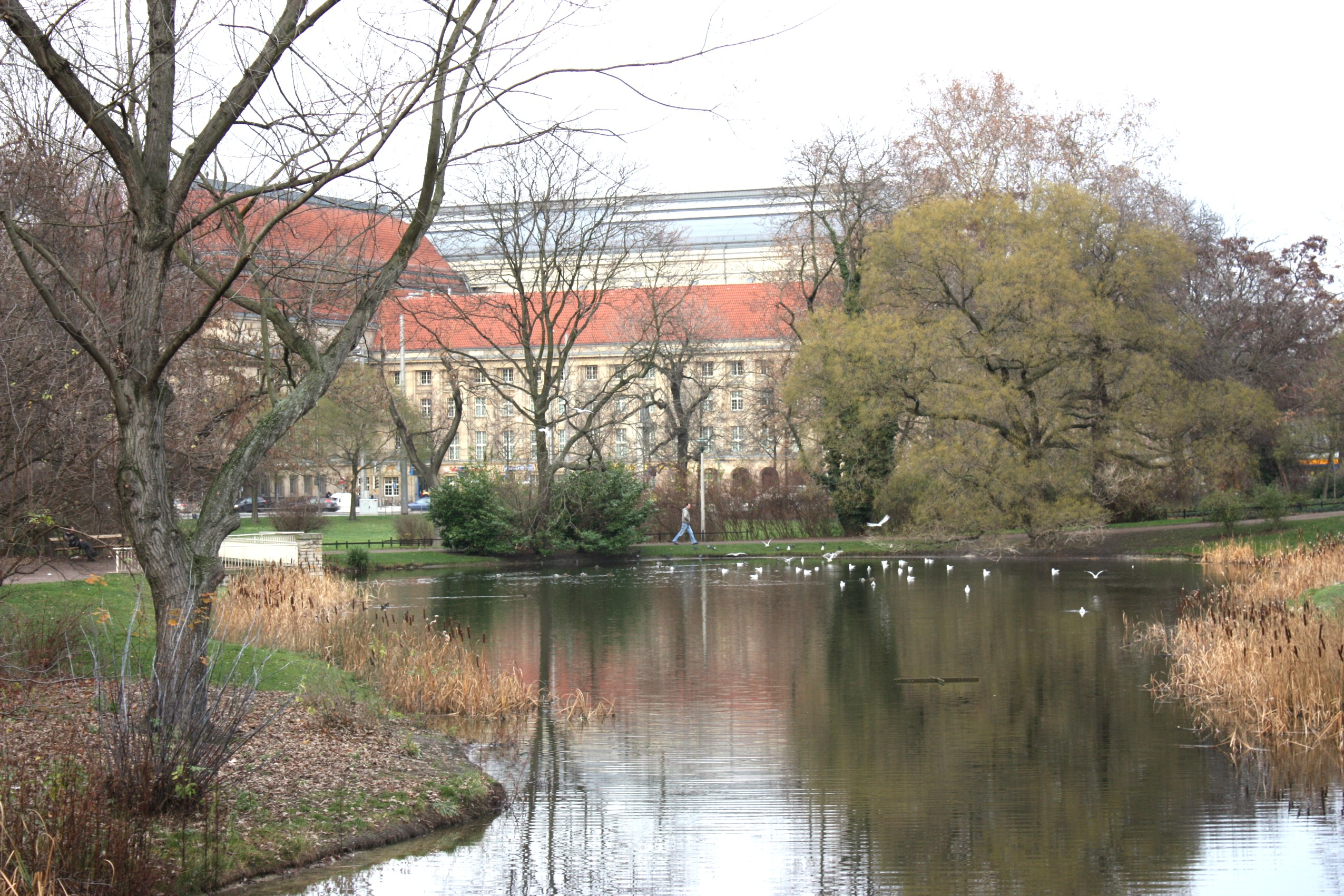
Schwanenteich, view towards Hauptbahnhof

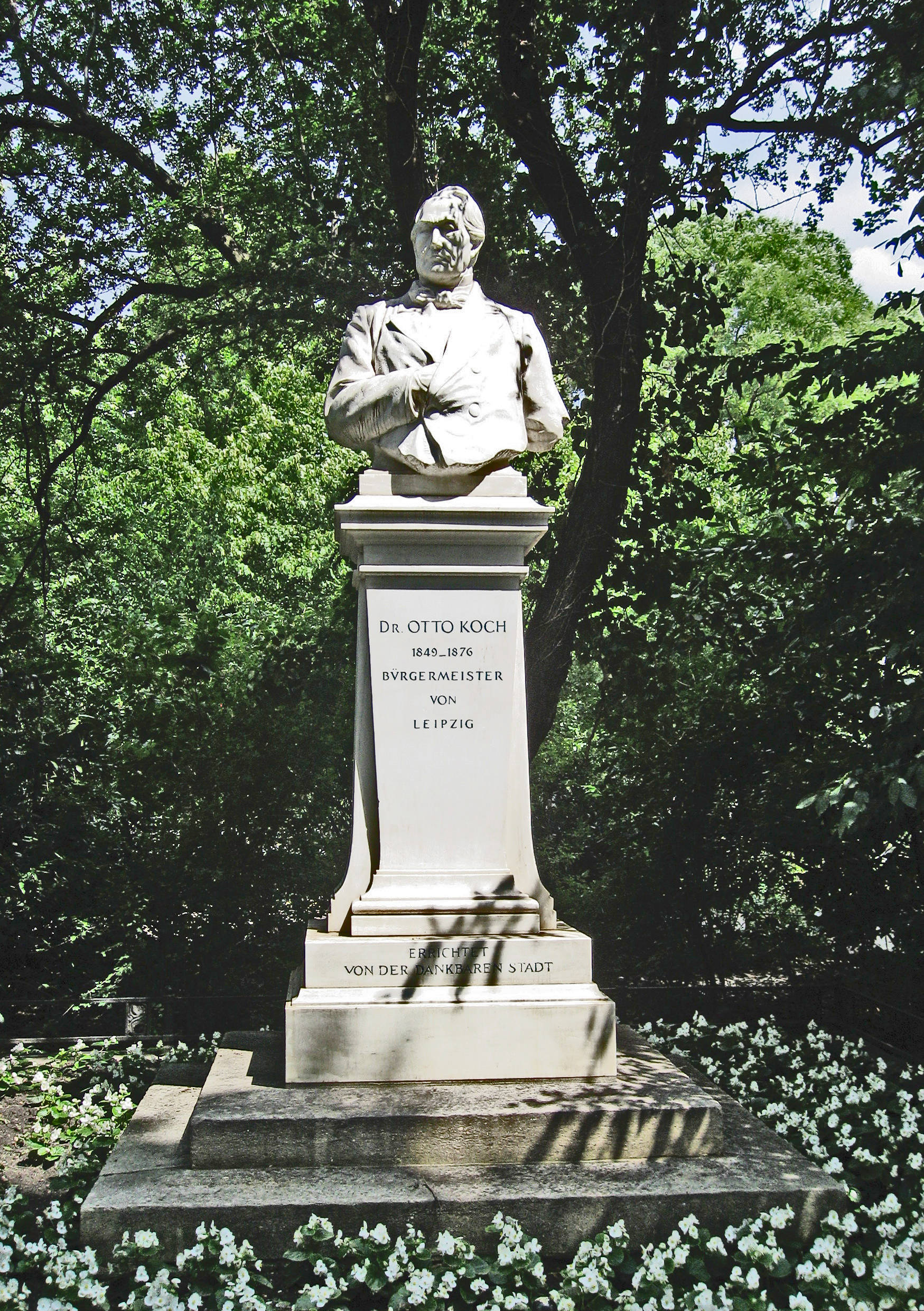
Mémorial to mayor Koch in the Lenné plant

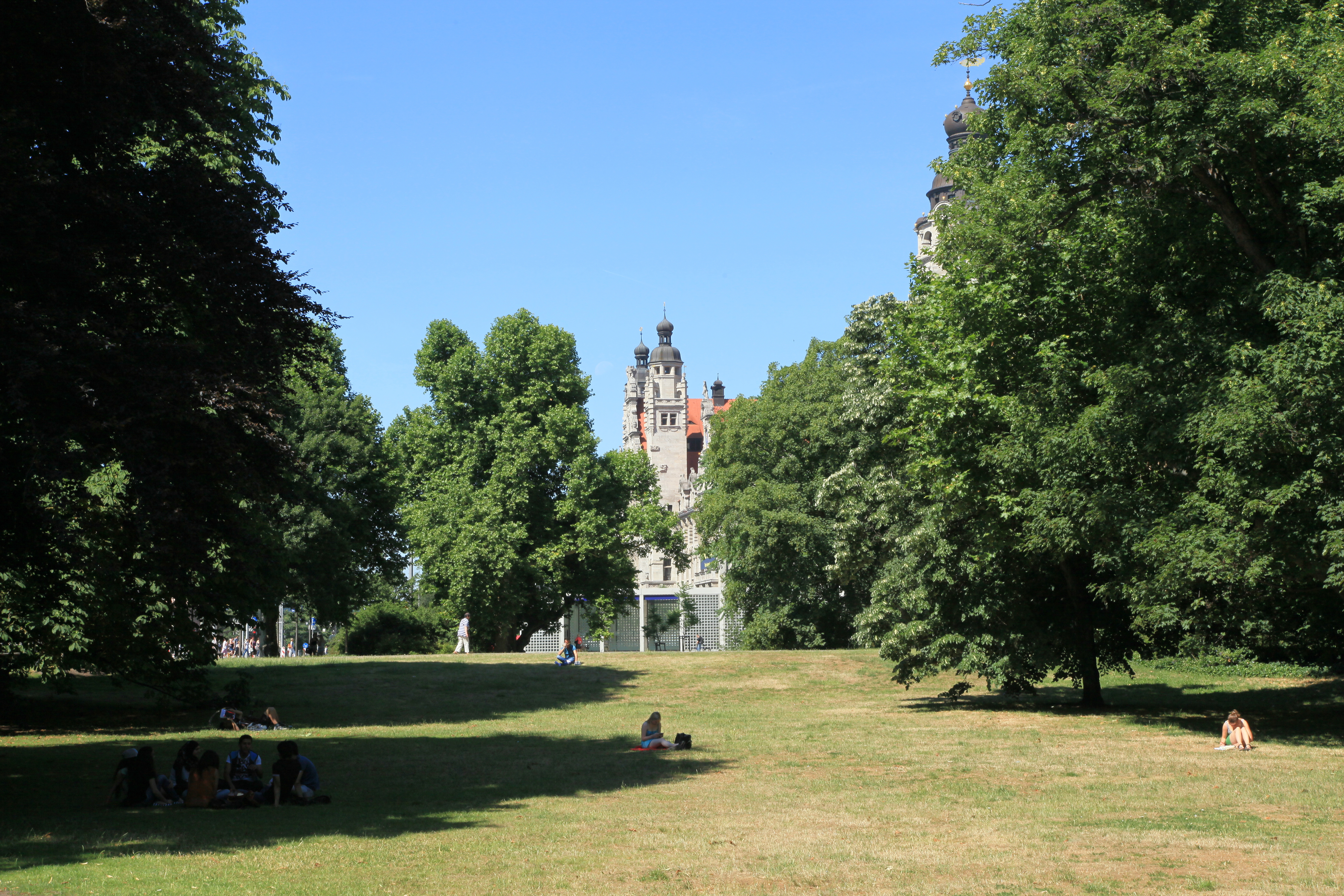
Lenné plant

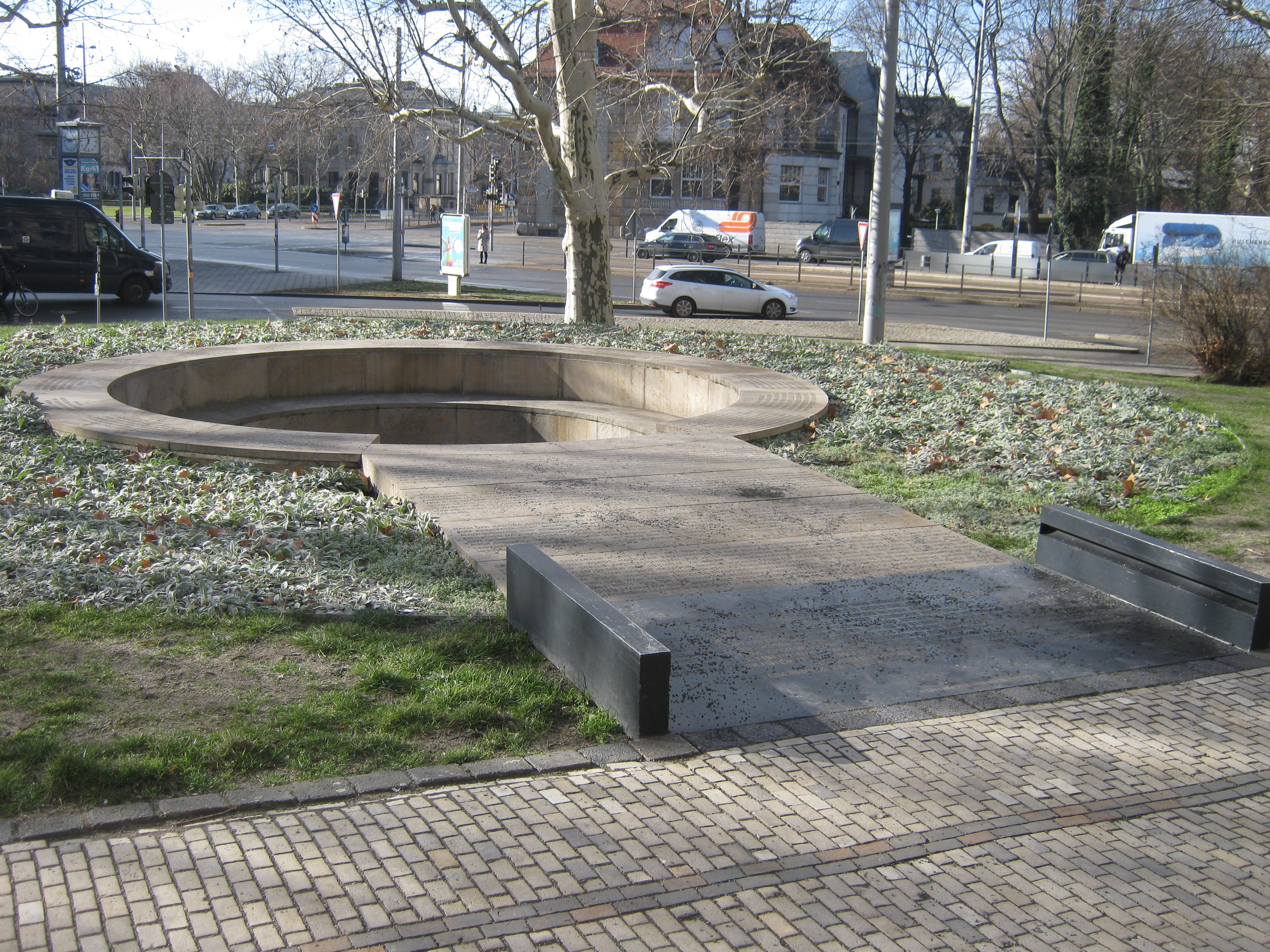
Memorial of Jenny Holzer to Goerdeler at the promenade at Martin-Luther-Ring

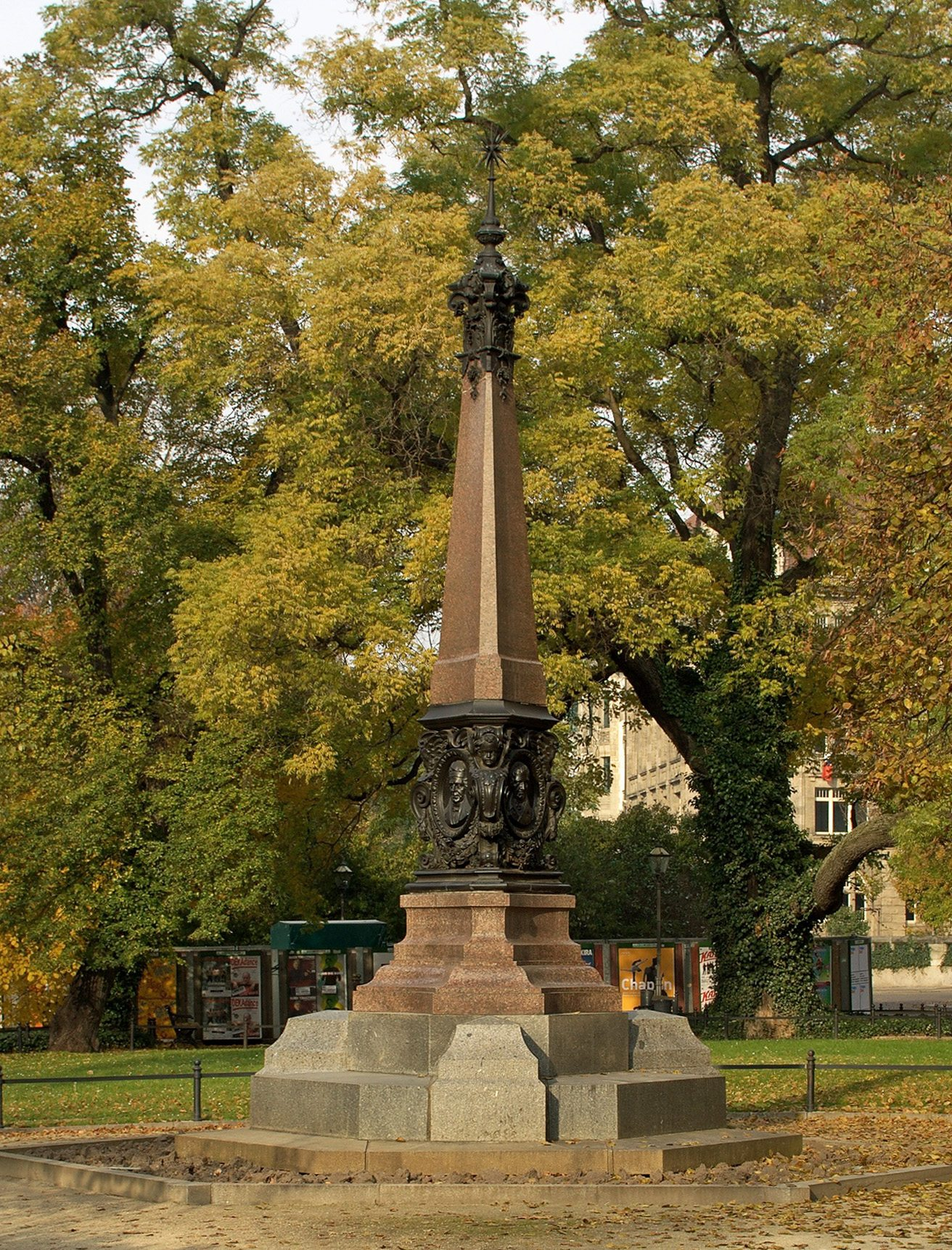
Plato-Dolz-Memorial at Dittrichring

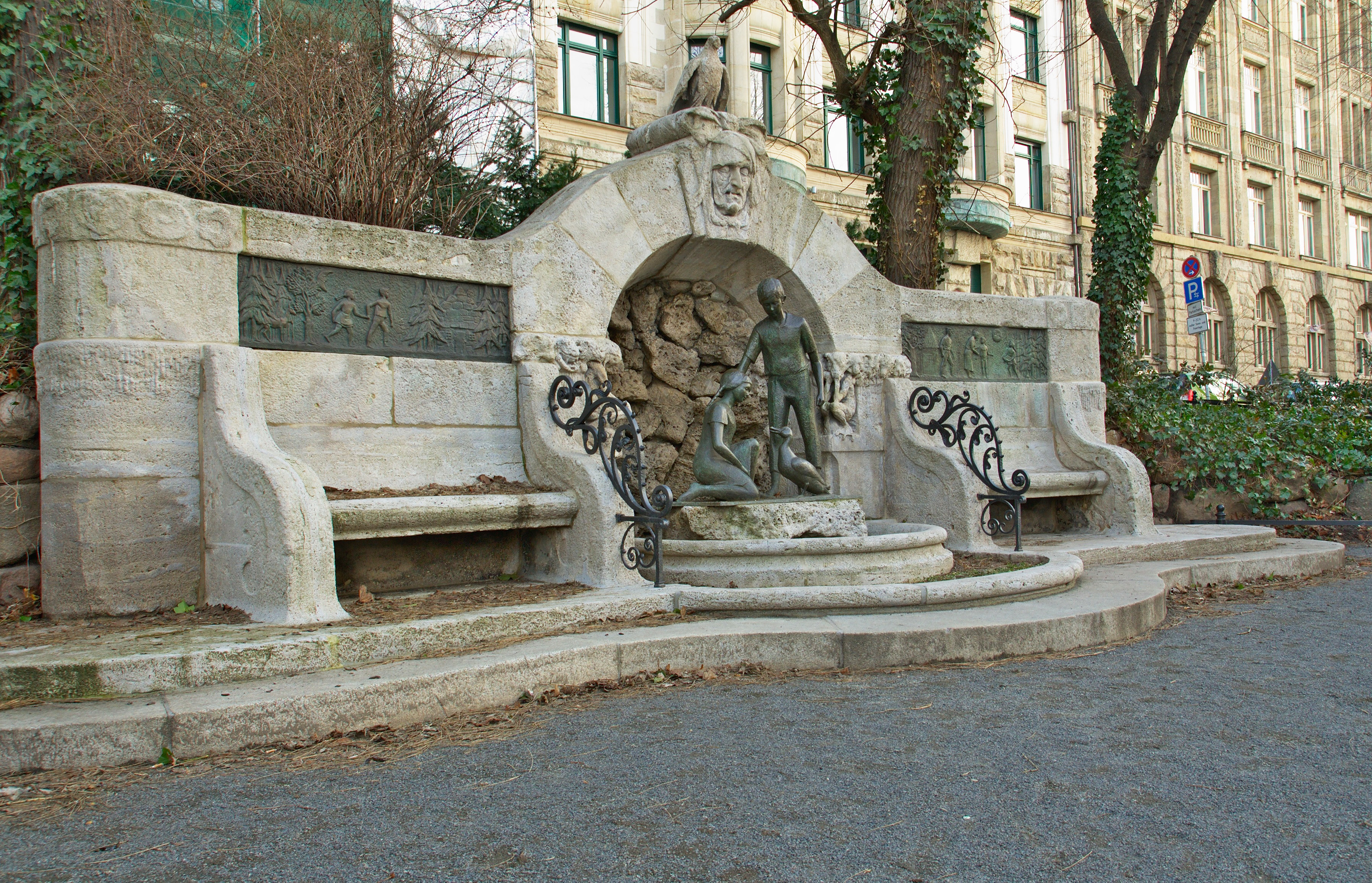
Dittrichring Märchenbrunnen (Fairy Tale Fountain)

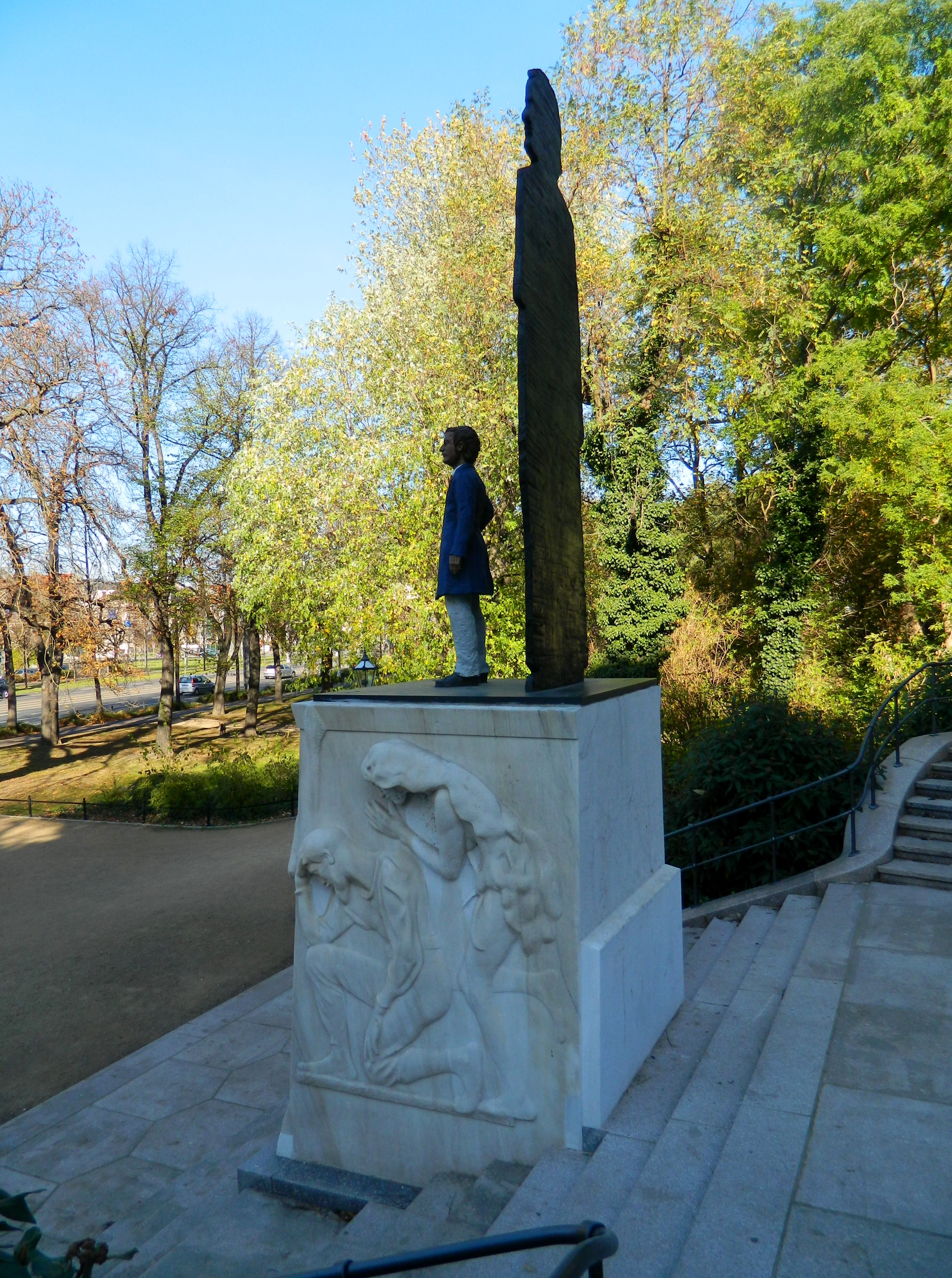
2013 memorial to Richard Wagner

=== Lower Park ===
The Lower Park (today also called Müller-Park) is located in the northeast of the Promenadenring in front of the main train station, stretched out between Richard-Wagner-Straße and Willy-Brandt-Platz. The Lower Park, like the Upper Park, was created during the tenure of Mayor Carl Wilhelm Müller from 1777. Today, the defining element is the poplar-planted garden roundel with the Müller monument, which was redesigned in this form after the construction of the main station from 1910 to 1915 by the Leipzig garden director Carl Hampel.

=== Upper Park (Park am Schwanenteich) ===
The Upper Park, which was originally connected to the Lower Park, is now separated from it by Goethestrasse. Above all, the part with the Schwanenteich (swan pond) has been preserved, while the Schneckenberg (snail mountain) no longer exists. When the park was laid out in 1780, a part of the old water-bearing city moat was converted into a pond. A part of the large meadow area and the historic route has been preserved here. Until the 1860s, the "Schneckenberg" was located at the location of the opera. It is there that Theodor Körner is said to have composed "Lützow's wilde verwegene Jagd". In 1983, a bust of Richard Wagner was installed.

=== Augustusplatz ===
Augustusplatz adjoins the Upper Park on the east side of the Promenadenring. Even before 1800, the square in front of the Grimma town gate was designed with two round lawns surrounded by trees. The architectural enclosure of the square began in 1830 with the erection of representative buildings. In 1857 Peter Joseph Lenné planned a framing with avenues and representative formal decorations for Augustusplatz. After the destruction of the World War II, it took until 1981 for the Gewandhaus to be built on the square now named after Karl Marx again received a complete architectural enclosure. Since the redesign in 1998, newly planted rows of linden trees are intended to remind of the original promenade plantings, but are located at a different location.

=== Lenné-Anlage (Lenné plant) ===
The Lenné-Anlage, also known as Schillerpark, is located in the south-east of the Promenadenring. The outer bailey in the area between the town gates Grimmaisches Tor and Peterstor, which had previously been used as a plant nursery, was filled up in 1857 on the initiative of Mayor Otto Koch and completely redesigned according to a design by Peter Joseph Lenné. To the south of the Moritzbastei, the so-called promenade hill was raised, from which you can see the tower of the New Town Hall (then: the tower of the Pleissenburg) over a gentle, valley-like depression. The facility was opened on Schiller's 100th birthday on 10 November 1859. In addition to a Schiller memorial, there is also a memorial to Mayor Koch and a number of other monuments in the complex.

=== Martin Luther Ring ===
On the south-west corner of the ring, the promenade was redesigned by the city's garden director, Hampel, after the new building and the opening of the new town hall at the beginning of the 20th century. The previously rather modest green areas were given a formal structure with elaborate ornamental plantings, which was related to the structure of the building and facade. There is still a row of trees from the plane tree avenue that was once planted. The promenade ring continues on the other side of the traffic ring in the Fritz-von-Harck-Anlage and the Plastikgarten.

=== Dittrichring ===
On the west side of the ring is the oldest part of the Promenadenring, which began here before the Seven Years' War with an avenue of lime trees and the Muhmenplatz near St. Thomas church. Life was lively here, nannies met and children played under large linden trees. Between 1903 and 1906, Hampel, director of municipal gardens, also left his mark in this area. Around Plato Dolz memorial, the Old Bach Monument and in front of the St. Thomas Church, a representative open space design with ornamental plants was created, which harmonized with the historicist architecture. Hampel presented them as a prime example in a specialist book. In the run-up to the Bach Year of 2000, this design was restored and a copy of the Mendelssohn memorial that had been dismantled in front of the Old Gewandhaus in 1936 was erected. Further north, in the area of the upper Dittrichring, the promenades have a forest-like appearance in a relatively small space. Around the Märchenbrunnen (fairy tale fountain) created in 1906 with motifs from "Hansel and Gretel", whose bronze figures, which were melted down during WW II for armament purposes, were modeled in 1963, there is a corresponding scenery with planted forest shrubs and ferns.

=== Goerdelerring / Tröndlinring ===
This is the northwest section of the ring. Parallel to the Goerdelerring there are 350 meters (1170 ft.) of ring green. Among other things, a staircase designed by Max Klinger was built there in 1913, which led to the Matthäikirchhof and on which a statue of Richard Wagner designed by Max Klinger was to be placed. On 22 May 2013, on the occasion of the composer's 200th birthday, a modern designed Wagner memorial by the artist Stephan Balkenhol was opened here. Also worth mentioning is the monument erected in 1851 for the Leipzig doctor and lecturer Christian Friedrich Samuel Hahnemann (1753-1843). The decorative plantings surrounding the monument by Carl Hampel were restored. The Richard-Wagner-Straße in front of the Höfe am Brühl hardly gives any indication that a green ring of promenades once ran from this point to the Lower Park described above.

== Names associated with Promenade Ring ==
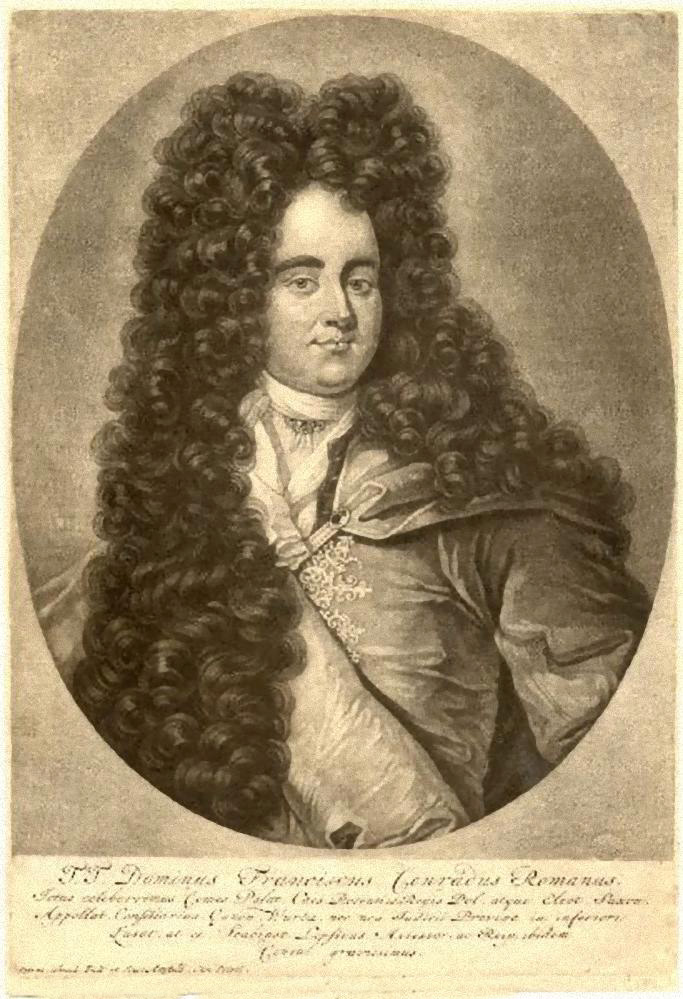
Mayor Franz Romanus around 1700

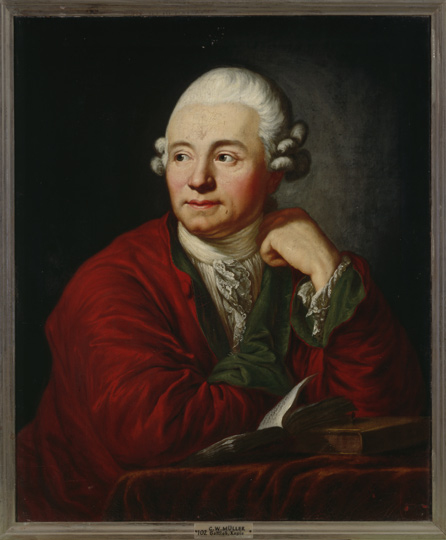
Mayor Carl Wilhelm Müller

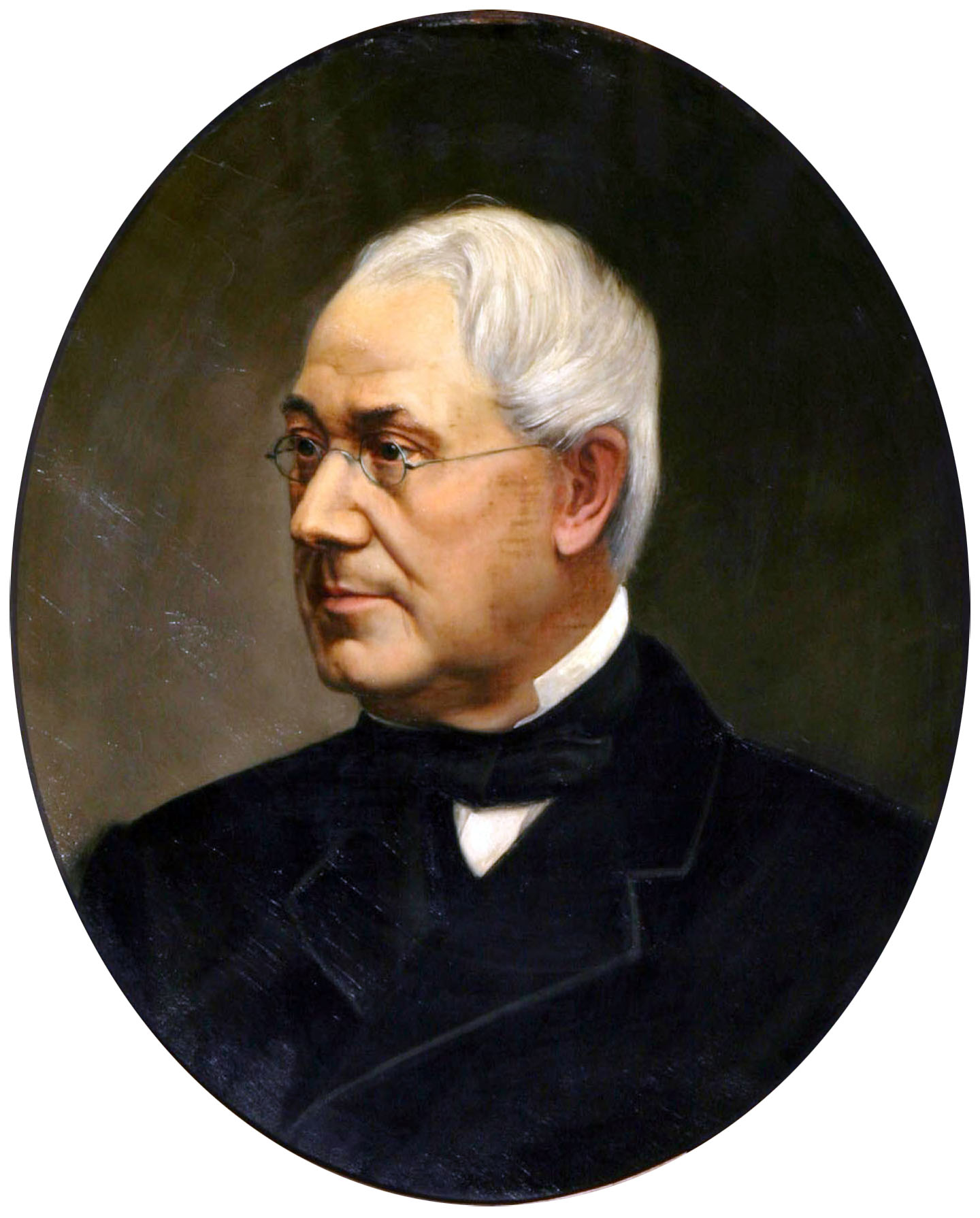
Mayor Otto Koch (around 1850)

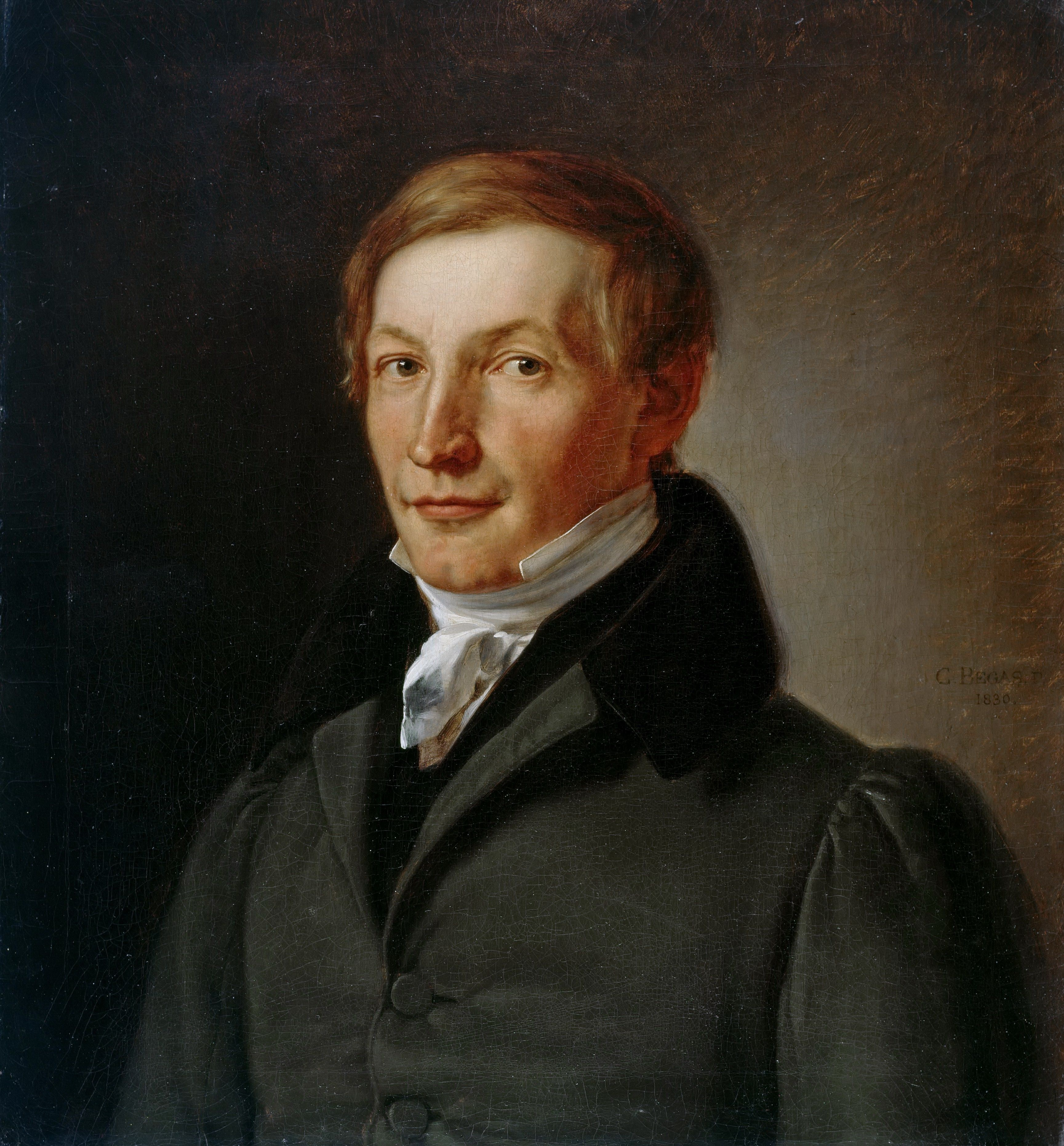
Peter Joseph Lenné

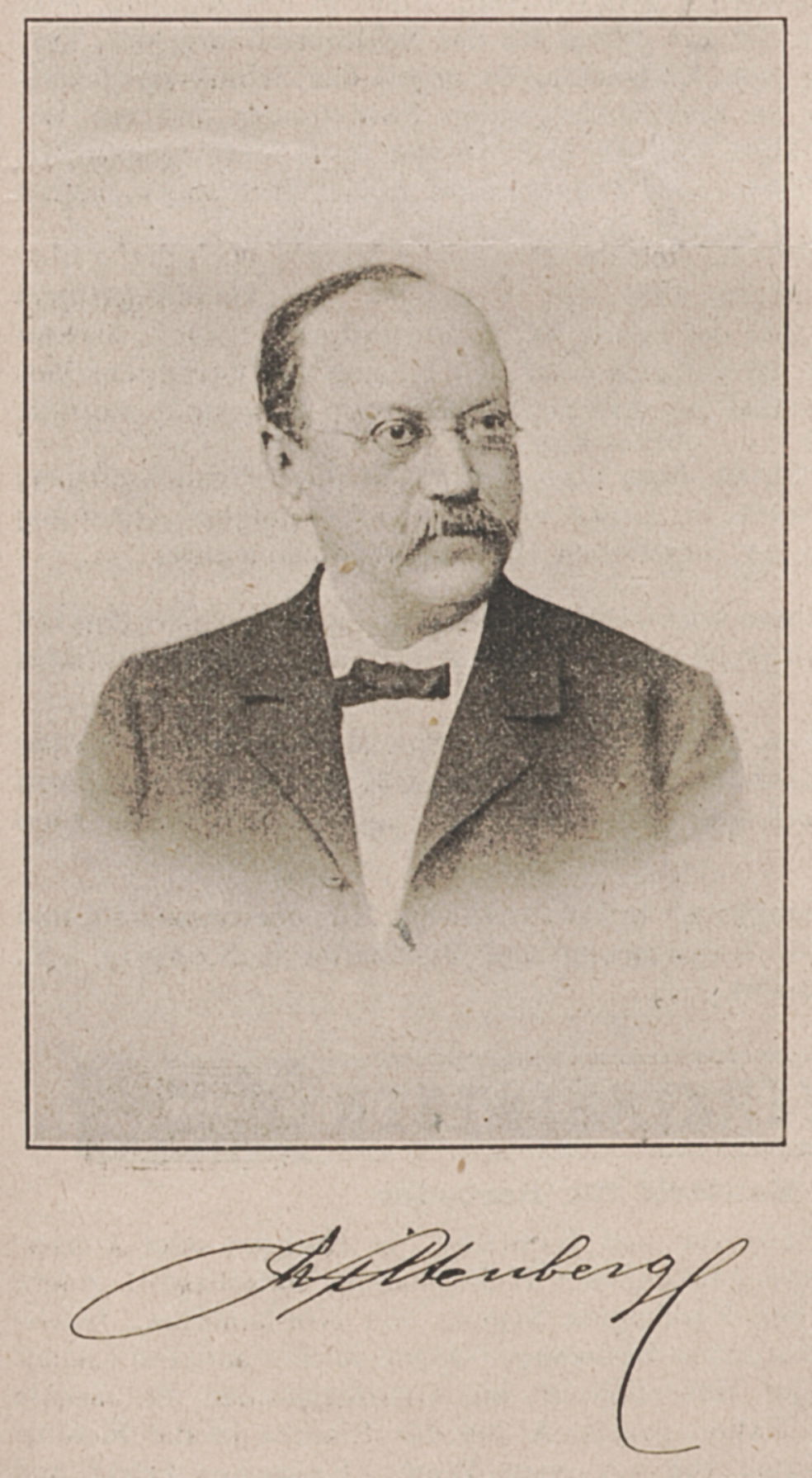
Otto Wittenberg, 1900

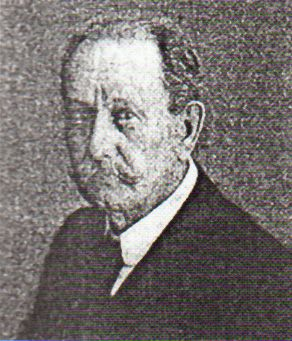
Carl Hampel
- Franz Conrad Romanus (1671–1746), mayor of Leipzig, who in 1702/03 had the moat in front of the western town portals (between the Barfusser and Thomas portals) drained and lime tree avenues laid out on the outer walls, which formed the first beginning of the later ring of promenades.
- Friedrich August II (1696–1763), the Saxon sovereign who, after the Peace of Hubertusburg (1763), ceded to the city of Leipzig the city fortifications (with the exception of the Pleissenburg) that had proved useless
- Carl Wilhelm Müller (1728–1801), mayor of Leipzig, who, instead of selling them, secured the ramparts for the public green spaces of the Promenadenring and was honored with a memorial at his favorite place on the Promenade the so-called Müller-Denkmal, opposite today's main station.
- Johann Carl Friedrich Dauthe (1749-1816), the first building director of the city of Leipzig, planned the green areas in the then emerging English style.
- Carl F. Kühns, 1794 the first council gardener of the city of Leipzig.
- Rudolph Siebeck (1812–1878) was the city council gardener for the city of Leipzig from 1846 to 1857 and then the city council gardener for the city of Vienna.
- Carl Wilhelm Otto Koch (1810–1876), mayor of Leipzig, who convinced the council of the design of the Lenné plant in 1857 and thus achieved a great success for Leipzig.
- Peter Joseph Lenné (1789–1866), as General Garden Director of the Royal Prussian Gardens, in the 1850s, he advised on the planning of several cities, including Dresden, Leipzig and Munich, he also designed the Lenné-Anlage (Lenné plant) in Leipzig in 1857 (and immediately afterwards the Johannapark in Leipzig).
- Otto Wittenberg (1834–1918), was Lenné's employee and continued his work as Leipzig's garden director for 40 years.
- Carl Hampel (1849-1930), was Wittenberg's employee and successor and redesigned the Promenadenring in the area of the New Town Hall and the Dietrichring.
- Nikolaus Molzen (1881-1954), was Hampel's employee and successor and was unable to avert the interventions of the 20th century (widening of streets, wartime destruction) on the promenade greenery.

== Quotations ==
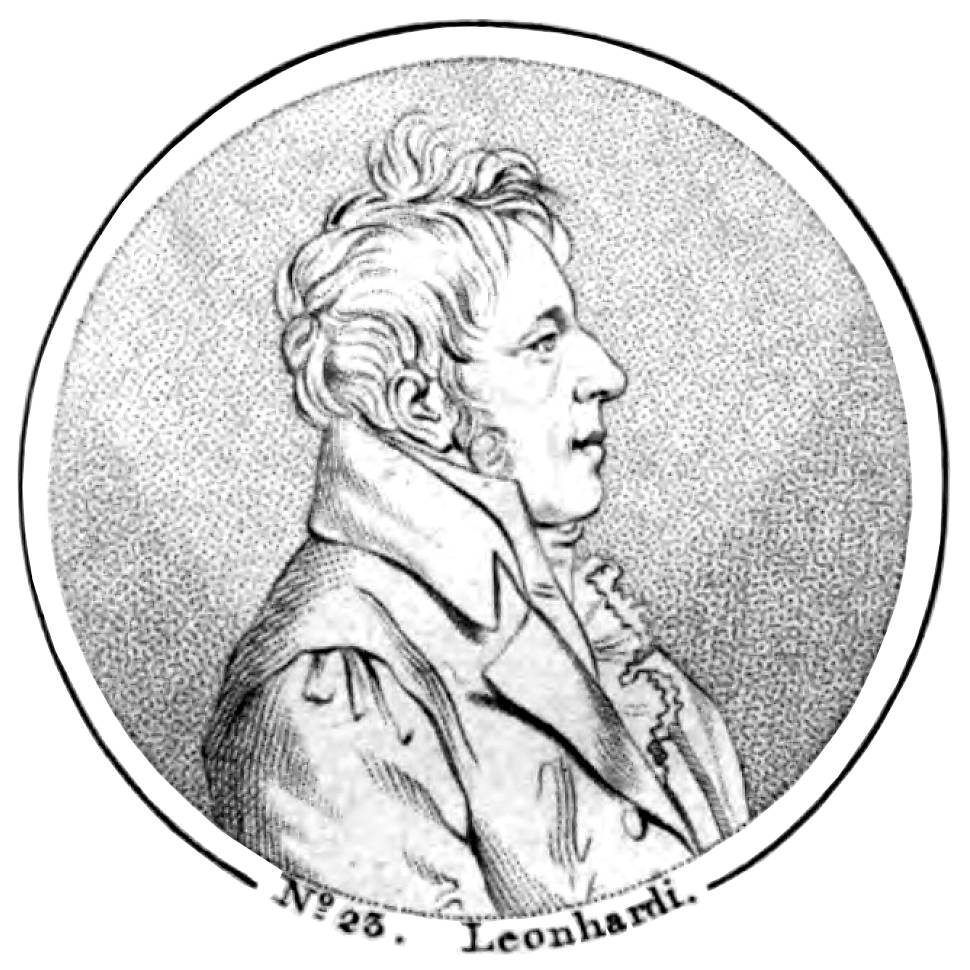
Friedrich Gottlob Leonhardi

"One of the most diverse and pleasant walks is the promenade around the city, which has gradually emerged since 1770 from the former fortifications and city moats filled with stagnant, foul-smelling water through the restless zeal of the secret war councilor and mayor D. Müller. (...) The whole area between the city and the suburbs is in and around the public walkways partly planted with tall trees, partly with shrubs, which are either native to us or have their homeland outside of Germany. (...) But what must not be forgotten here (...) is respect and protection in general, which the lowest classes of the local inhabitants show to these enclosures, which are now also populated with the lovely singing nightingales, which some patriotic citizens have placed in them, and which, when they resist, return to their pleasant dwelling places every year and nest in them."

— Friedrich Gottlob Leonhardi, 1799

"You know, my friend, I use few words. – That's why I'll go straight ahead through this small portal.* The ditch around the city full of water without flow lets us see a little bridge and this takes us up. – Oh, don't hurry from this green spot! - This is a nanny's place! – Why are you laughing so brightly? – Methinks he is worthy of being shown to strangers! – And what can I do about it if his name is not different? A troop of children and maids often sits on grass and daisies, and these are called nannies." * The so-called Barfusser portal

— Friedrich Adolph Kritzinger, 1781

== Literature ==
- Ringel, Sebastian (2015). Pleasure Gardens and Promenades, in: Leipzig! One Thousand Years of History. Leipzig: Author and Edition Leipzig in the Seemann Henschel GmbH & Co. KG. pp. 66–69. ISBN 978-3-361-00710-9.
- Horst Riedel: Promenadenring In: Stadtlexikon Leipzig von A bis Z. PRO LEIPZIG, Leipzig 2012, ISBN 978-3-936508-82-6, p. 400 (in German)
- Promenadenring, in: Peter Benecken, Parks & Gärten im Grünen Ring Leipzig, ed. by Pro Leipzig, Stadt Leipzig, Grüner Ring and culturtraeger Leipzig, Leipzig 2014, ISBN 978-3-945027-10-3, pp. 10–13 (in German)
- Nadja Horsch, Simone Tübbecke (ed): Bürger Gärten Promenaden. Leipziger Gartenkultur im 18. und 19. Jahrhundert., Passage-Verlag Leipzig 2018, ISBN 978-3-95415-072-4, in German
- Andreas Martin, Der Leipziger Promenadenring. Eine Rundfahrt., Lehmstedt Verlag Leipzig 2011, ISBN 978-3-937146-85-0, in German
- Wolfgang Hocquél: Leipzig. Architektur von der Romanik bis zur Gegenwart, Passage, 2. stark erweiterte Auflage, Leipzig 2004, ISBN 3-932900-54-5, p. 21, in German
- Alberto Schwarz, Das Alte Leipzig – Stadtbild und Architektur, Sax-Verlag, Beucha-Markleeberg 2018, ISBN 978-3-86729-226-9, in German
- Alberto Schwarz, Leipzig um 1850 – ein Gang durch die Stadt, Sax-Verlag, Beucha-Markleeberg 2021, ISBN 978-3-86729-277-1, in German
- Kathrin Franz, Promenadenring Leipzig, in: Staatliche Schlösser, Burgen und Gärten Sachsens (Hrsg.), Sachsen Grün. Historische Gärten und Parks, L & H Verlag Hamburg / Berlin 2006, ISBN 3-938608-02-1, pp. 166–168, in German
