= Bust of Richard Wagner =

Bronze sculpture in Leipzig, Germany

Coordinates: 51.34124°N 12.38214°E

- Richard-Wagner-Büste (German)
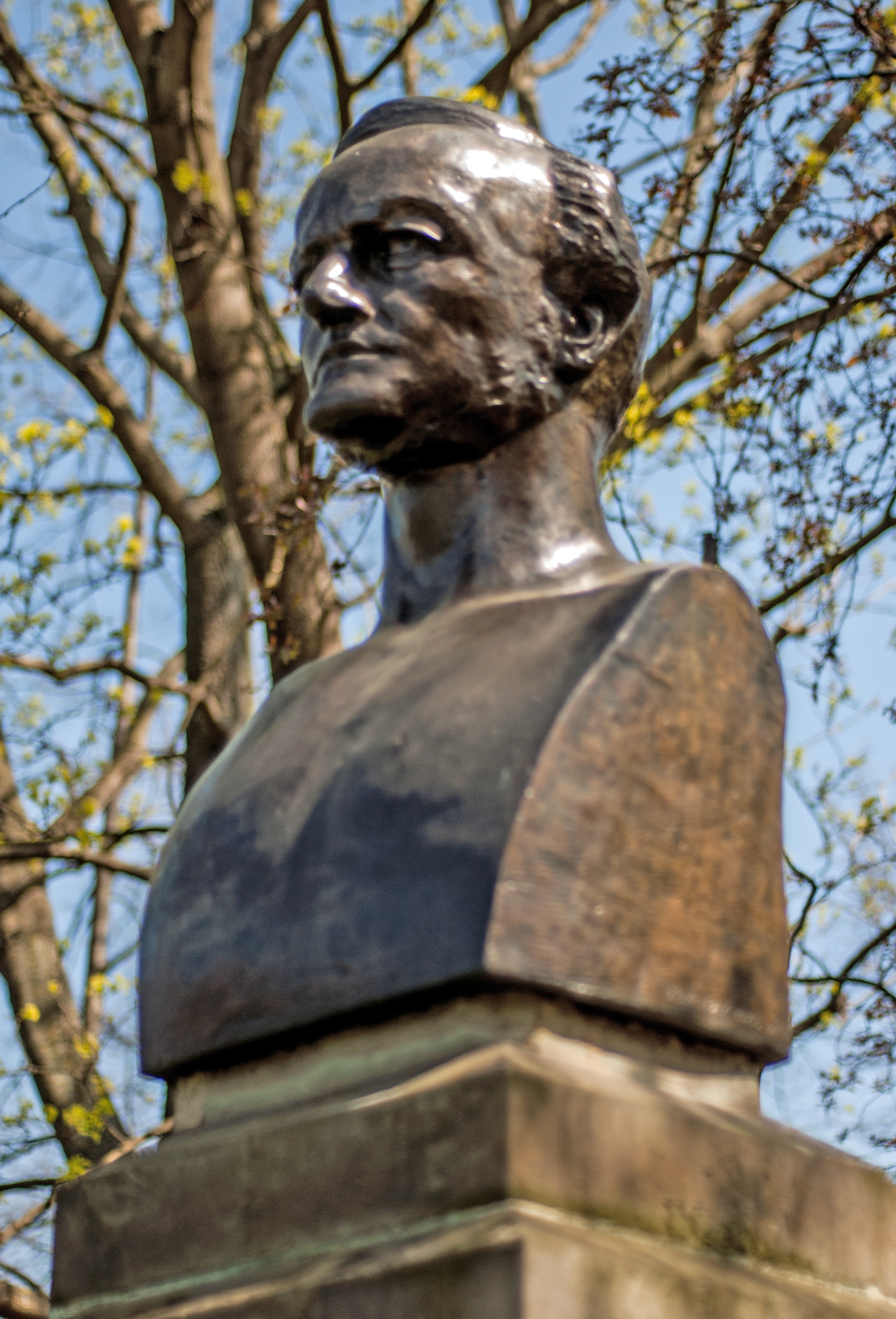
- Artist: Max Klinger
- Year: 1982
- Medium: Bronze
- Subject: Richard Wagner
- Dimensions: 93 cm (37 in)
- Location: Promenadenring, Leipzig

The Bust of Richard Wagner in Leipzig, inaugurated in 1983, is dedicated to the Leipzig-born composer Richard Wagner (1813–1883). The design goes back to the Leipzig sculptor Max Klinger (1857–1920).

== Location and shape ==
The Bust of Richard Wagner stands in the Promenadenring behind the opera house on the eastern slope of the Schwanenteich (Swan Pond), looking west. The location can almost be considered slightly hidden.

The larger than life bust made of dark patinated bronze is 93 centimetres (37 in) tall and rests on a simple sandstone base. This bears the inscription RICHARD WAGNER on the front and MAX KLINGER on the back. On the side, BRONZE NOACK LEIPZIG 1982 indicates the manufacturer. The portrait shows the mature Wagner in classically austere simplicity in a frontal view without any indication of clothing.

== History ==
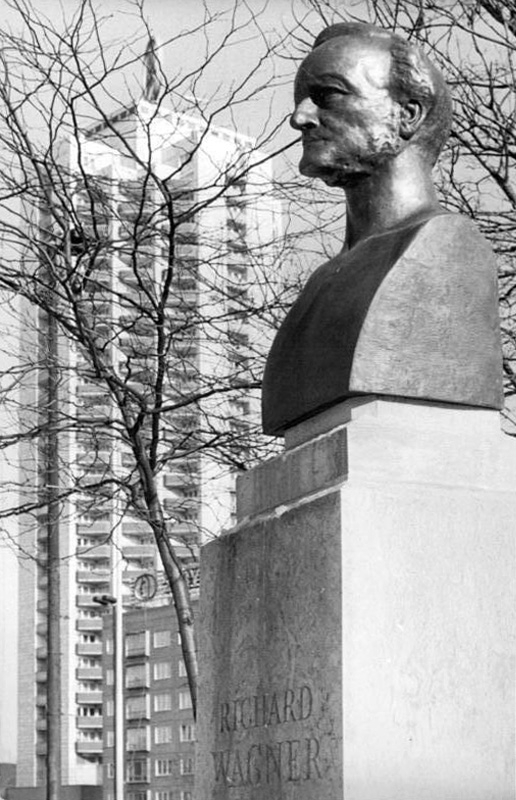
The bust on the day of its inauguration, 7 February 1983

Neither Max Klinger's efforts from 1903 until the First World War to create a representative monument to the composer in his birthplace in Leipzig, nor the ambitious plans during the Nazi era to erect a monumental memorial at the Richard Wagner Hain, the southern part of the Palmengarten, were successful.

When Wagner's 170th birthday and the 100th anniversary of his death were approaching in 1983, the city decided to find at least a small solution as part of the "Richard Wagner Days of the GDR". Max Klinger had created a Wagner bust made of white marble for the Leipzig Music Room at the 1904 World Exhibition in St. Louis. The original plaster of Paris of the bust was brought to the Museum of Fine Arts in Leipzig along with two casts from the Klinger estate. One of the plaster casts had already been prepared for bronze casting and was used in 1982 by the Leipzig bronze foundry Noack for the present memorial.

The Bust of Richard Wagner is the first completed public memorial to the composer in his birthplace. In the Wagner year of 2013, another Richard Wagner Memorial by Stephan Balkenhol (* 1957) in combination with elements by Max Klinger was erected in Leipzig.

== Bibliography ==
- Cottin, Markus; Klank, Gina; Kretzschmar, Karl-Heinz; Kürschner, Dieter; Petzold, Ilona (1998). Leipziger Denkmale [Leipzig Monuments] (in German). Beucha: Sax Verlag. pp. 79–80. ISBN 3-930076-71-3.
