= Carl Wilhelm Müller =

German politician (1728–1801)

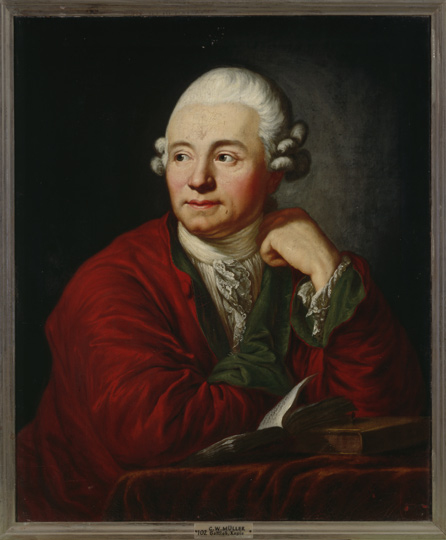

Mayor of Leipzig
- In office 1778–1801

Personal details
- Born: 15 September 1728 Knauthain
- Died: 28 February 1801 (aged 72) Leipzig, Germany

Carl Wilhelm Müller, also Karl Wilhelm Müller, (15 September 1728 in Knauthain – 28 February 1801 in Leipzig) served as mayor of the city of Leipzig several times from 1778 until his death. In this role, he made a particular contribution to the school system and urban development of Leipzig.

== Life ==
Müller was born as the son of a local judge from Knauthain that was at that time a village outside of Leipzig. His father later became a court director in Leipzig. After attending the Fürstenschule Pforta, Müller studied law, history, and philosophy at the University of Leipzig from 1741 to 1750. He then worked as a lawyer at the Oberhofgericht Leipzig. During this time, he founded a literary discussion group, wrote poems, and published a volume of poetry in collaboration with Christian Felix Weiße (1726–1804). From 1756 onwards, he published the journal Brittische Bibliothek, which dealt with new publications in English literature.

His political career began in 1759 when he became a member of the Leipzig City Council. From 1771, Müller served as a city judge. In 1775, he was appointed head of the city library and, in 1776, city architect. The Saxon government also appointed him to Fürstlicher Geheimer Kriegsrat in 1778. In the same year, Müller was elected mayor of Leipzig for the first time. This first term was followed by further terms in 1778/79, 1781/82, 1784/85, 1786/87, 1788/89, 1790/91, 1792/93, 1794, 1795/96, 1797/98, and 1799/1800.

During his time as head of the Leipzig Council, numerous urban development changes were made at his instigation, which still shape Leipzig's cityscape today. From 1784 onwards, he pushed for the creation of parks in the area of the demolished city fortifications. In this way, under the direction of the city planning director Johann Carl Friedrich Dauthe (1746–1816), the Promenadenring, which corresponds to today's ring road around Leipzig's city centre, and the Augustusplatz were created. At Müller's suggestion, Dauthe built the first municipal concert hall (Gewandhaus) above the Old Armory in 1781, and from 1785 to 1796 St. Nicholas Church was redesigned in the neoclassical style. Müller also paid particular attention to promoting Leipzig's school system. In 1783 he became head of the St. Nicholas School. During his term of office, the first public elementary school, the Ratsfreischule, was opened in 1792 and the Erste Leipziger Bürgerschule was opened in 1804.

Carl Wilhelm Müller was the first head of the Harmonie Society in Leipzig.

== Honor ==
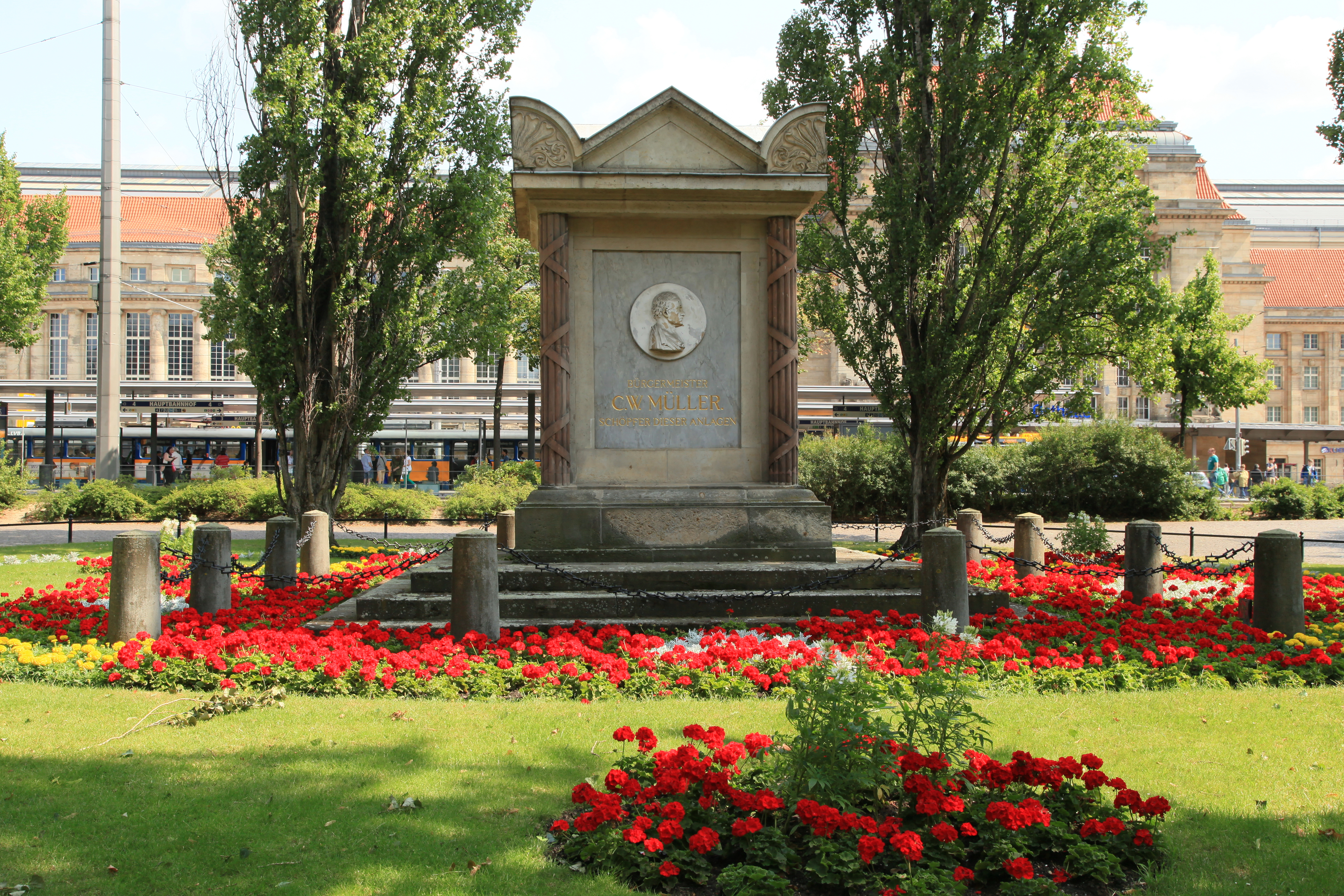
The Mayor Müller Memorial in Leipzig (2015)

Müller is present in the public consciousness today through the memorial erected in July 1819 at the instigation of Leipzig merchants in the Müller-Anlage at Willy-Brandt-Platz opposite the main train station. The memorial, designed by Johann Friedrich August Tischbein (1750–1812) and created by the city's building director August Wilhelm Kanne (1783–1827), consists of a marble block, on the south side of which is attached a medallion depicting Müller, created by Johann Gottfried Schadow (1764–1850). The original medallion has since disappeared; it was replaced by a copy in 1984. In 2022, the memorial was restored.

Müller's birthplace, popularly known as the Mayor Müller House, still stands in the Leipzig locality of Knauthain. The building, constructed in 1723, was saved from decay in late 2008. In 2013, a café opened there, and an artist's studio moved in.
