= Richard Wagner Memorial =

2013 monument by Stephan Balkenhol

Coordinates: 51.342513°N 12.370422°E

- Richard Wagner Denkmal (German)
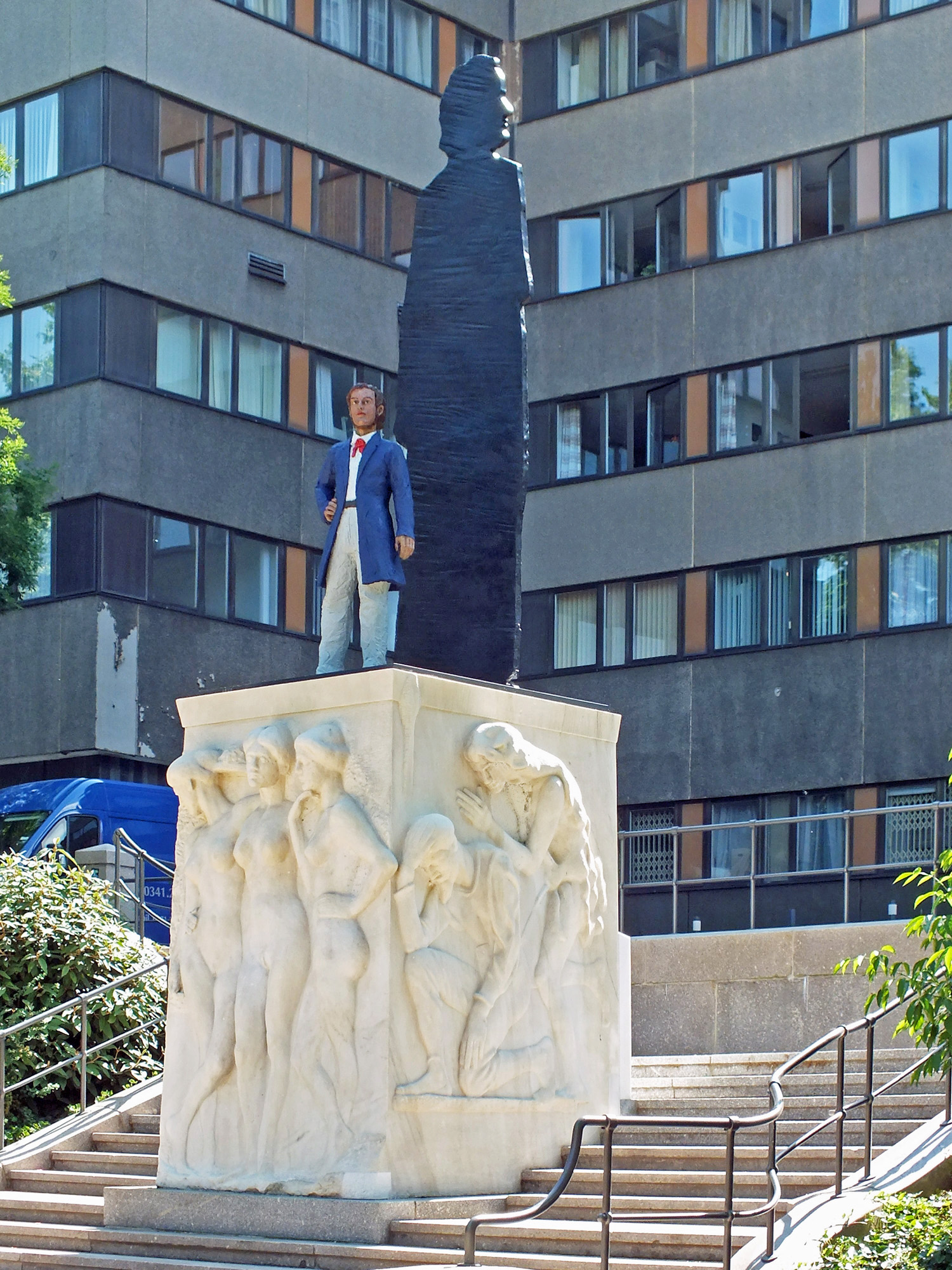
- Artist: Stephan Balkenhol
- Year: 2013
- Medium: marble, bronze
- Dimensions: 6.9 m × 2 m (23 ft × 6.6 ft)
- Location: Leipzig, Germany

The Richard Wagner Memorial in Leipzig was unveiled in 2013 to mark the 200th birthday of Richard Wagner (1813-1883). It was created by the German sculptor Stephan Balkenhol (born 1957) using the base designed 100 years ago by Max Klinger (1857-1920).

== Location ==
The Richard Wagner Memorial is located on the north-west side of Leipzig's city center in the green spaces at Goerdelerring, as part of the city center ring (also: Promenadenring), at the location that was already planned at the beginning of the 20th century. It stands on a stairway that used to lead from Fleischerplatz to Matthäi-Kirchhof. With the completely changed architectural surroundings - behind the stairs today there is an office building that was formerly built for the Stasi - it has no urban significance.

== Description ==
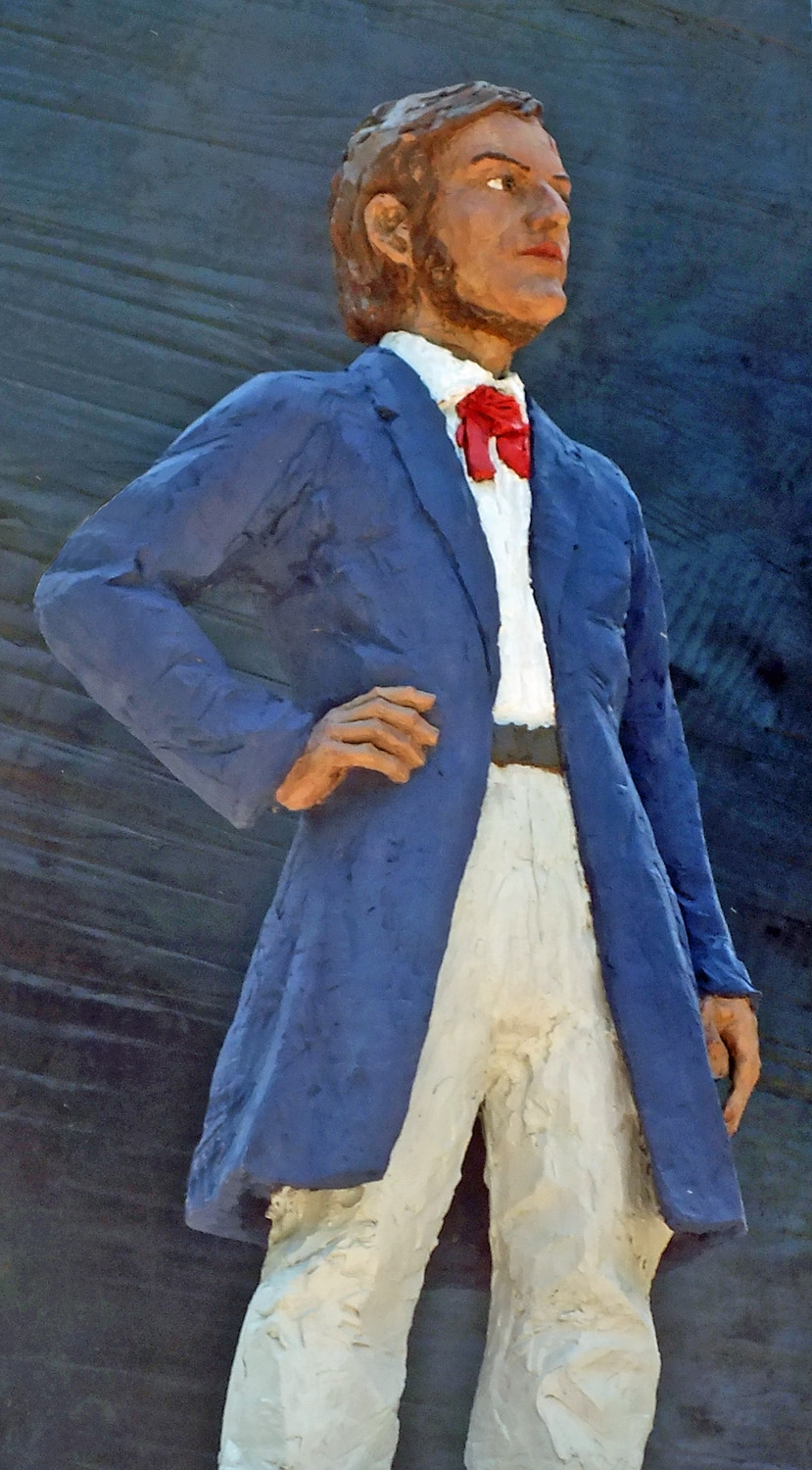
The Character of Young Wagner (2013)

The plinth of the monument resting on the staircase is the white marble cuboid designed by Max Klinger. It has an edge length of 2 metres (7 ft) and is 2.9 metres (10 ft) tall. Three of its side surfaces show figures from the work of Richard Wagner as reliefs in larger than life size. The three Rhinemaidens from the opera cycle Der Ring des Nibelungen are depicted as undressed women on the front. They are intended to symbolize music, poetry and drama at the same time and thus allude to Wagner's striving for the Gesamtkunstwerk. On the left are Siegfried, Mime and the slain dragon to see, on the right the Grail keeper Parsifal and the Grail messenger Kundry.

The young Wagner stands on the base as a colored bronze sculpture, 1.8 metres (6 ft) tall, in everyday clothes. Because in addition to be his birthplace, Leipzig is the place of his training years. "Wagner was 1.66 meters (5'3") tall, and Balkenhol doesn't intend to make the statue much taller. He wants to give the sculpture a human dimension, avoiding exaggeration and pathos: a short man on a pedestal." Behind this figure rises 4 metres (13 ft) tall like a shadow, a black bronze plate with the outline of the older Wagner, symbolizing his great life's work. The silhouette of the shadow quotes Klinger's design for a statue of Richard Wagner. Balkenhol himself described his design of the monument as a paraphrase of Klinger.

== History ==
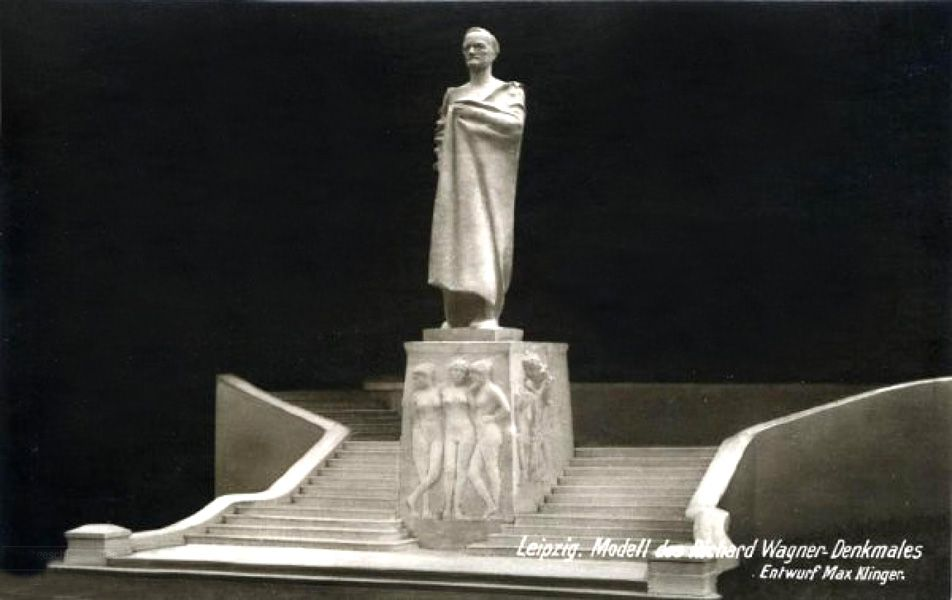
Klinger's monument design from 1911 (postcard from around 1913)

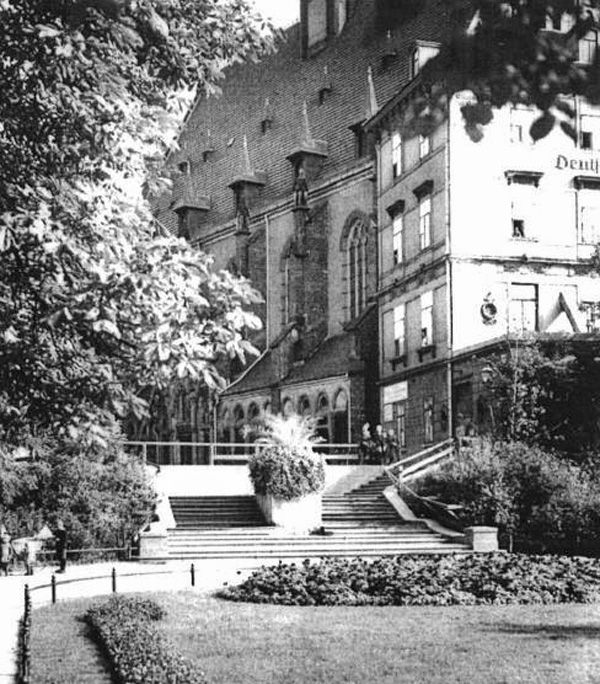
The old memorial staircase (1913)

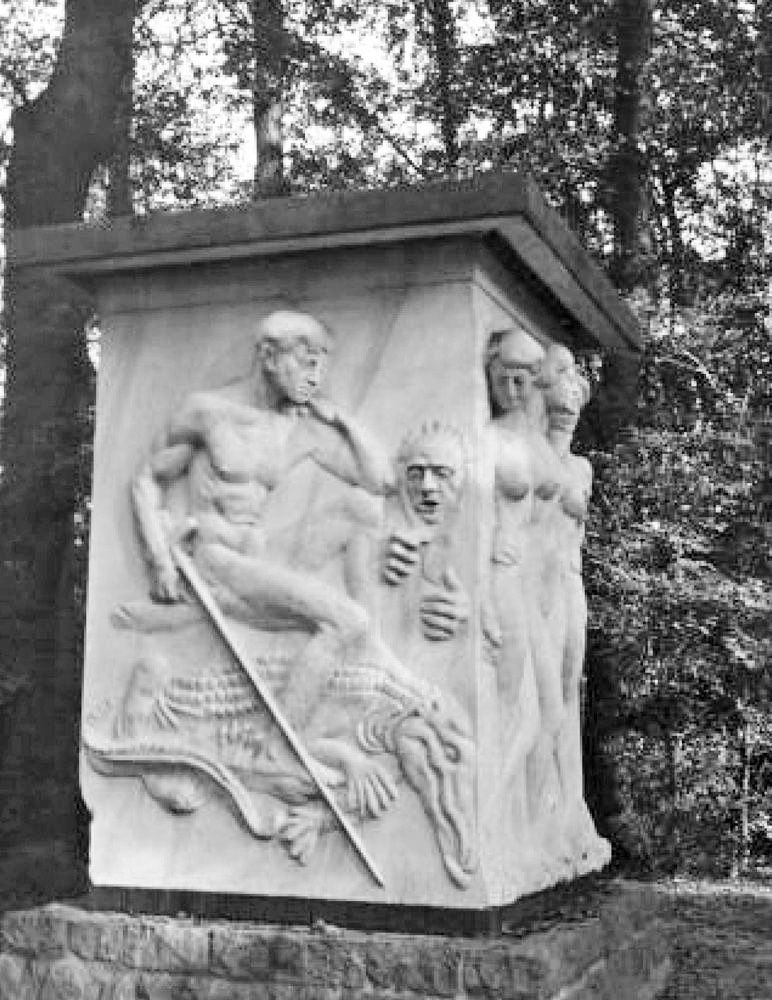
The memorial pedestal in Klingerhain (around 1930)

The first efforts to erect a Wagner monument in Leipzig date back to 1883. For his 70th birthday, three months after his death, a committee collected donations and considered locations for a memorial. After a few unsuccessful drafts, a memorial committee under Mayor Bruno Tröndlin (1835–1908) appealed to the Leipzig public in 1903 for donations and won the then most famous Leipzig artist, Max Klinger, for the execution. A first draft envisaged a 4 metres (13 ft) tall figure of the composer made of white marble, encased in a long, black coat made of heavy fabric, which was to stand at the Old Theater. The work on it was already in until the purchase of the marble block from Laas, South Tyrol, was thriving when, in 1911, Klinger submitted new plans to the then mayor, Rudolf Dittrich (1855–1929). Now a 5.3 metres (17 ft) tall Wagner figure was to be placed on a 3 metres (10 ft) tall pedestal with reliefs on the stairs between Fleischerplatz and Matthäikirchhof. Otto Wilhelm Scharenberg (1851–1920) extended this staircase according to Klinger's plans, and on the composer's 100th birthday in 1913, when the monument was supposed to be finished, the foundation stone was laid on the staircase at the site of today's monument. After that, nothing changed there for a long time. Klinger sent the plaster models for the reliefs to Laas to be transferred to the marble pedestal and had a second large block broken up for the marble statue. The outbreak of World War I, financial difficulties and finally Klinger's death in 1920 prevented progress. The pedestal came to Leipzig in 1924 and was erected in the Klingerhain, the southern part of the Palmengarten, after being reworked by the Leipzig sculptor and Klinger's heir, Johannes Hartmann (1869–1952). It stood here for over 80 years, sometimes also referred to as the “porn cube” because of the naked Rhinemaidens.

In relation to the 50th anniversary of Wagner's death, a new memorial project was started in 1932 under Mayor Carl Goerdeler (1884-1945). The sculptor Emil Hipp (1893–1965) won an ideas competition. The foundation stone for what is now the planned “Richard Wagner National Monument” was laid near the Elster basin on 6 March 1934 by Adolf Hitler (1889–1945) at Goerdeler’s side. The figures and friezes made by Hipp for the monumental monument up to 1944 could not be brought to Leipzig before the end of World War II. After that, the city of Leipzig rejected their takeover because of the supposed ideological encumbrance on the monument, although those have already been paid. In the city, the associated park was preserved, the Richard-Wagner-Hain.

On the occasion of the 170th birthday and the 100th anniversary of Richard Wagner's death, a Richard Wagner bust based on a design by Max Klinger was erected in 1983 in the park at the Schwanenteich north of Leipzig's opera house.

In 2005, Wagner admirers organized the Wagner Memorial Association e. V., whose aim was to have the Klinger Wagner memorial from 1911 completed. The Klinger Association also took a stake in the company. Nine artists submitted their designs in a competition. In 2011, the jury chose the design by Stephan Balkenhol from among the last three remaining in a selection, followed by a heated public discussion. In the meantime, in 2010, the staircase that had been demolished in the 1970s had been rebuilt and the Klinger memorial base was attached to it. To finance the monument, part of the money was collected through the sale of donation certificates, but the main part came from the artist himself. Stephan Balkenhol had 25 small onesmade bronze replicas of the monument, the sale of which essentially funded the monument.

On 22 May 2013, the 200th birthday of Richard Wagner, the Balkenhol memorial was unveiled to applause, but also to some disapproval.

== See also ==
- Richard Wagner Hain
- Bust of Richard Wagner

== Literature ==
- Wagner Denkmal e.V. (2013). Stephan Balkenhol. Richard Wagner. Leipzig (in German). Cologne: Verlag der Buchhandlung Walter König. ISBN 978-3-86335-391-9.
- Cottin, Markus; Klank, Gina; Kretzschmar, Karl-Heinz; Kürschner, Dieter; Petzold, Ilona (1998). Leipziger Denkmale (in German). Beucha: Sax-Verlag. ISBN 3-930076-71-3.
- Voerkel, Stefan (2013), "Wagner in Playmobil?", Leipziger Blätter (in German), vol. 63, pp. 24–26
- Marie-Louise Monrad Møller: Wagner im Schatten – Die Geschichte des Richard Wagner-Denkmals in Leipzig. In: Leipziger Stadtgeschichte. Jahrbuch 2013. Sax-Verlag Beucha 2014, ISBN 978-3-86729-129-3, S. 111–162 The first six pages of the article (in German)
- Marie-Louise Monrad Møller: Eklektische Erinnerung. Stephan Balkenhols Richard Wagner-Denkmal als Gegendenkmal. In: Hans Werner Schmidt & Jeanette Stoschek (Hrsg.): Max Klinger. „…schon der leiseste Zwang nimmt mir die Luft“. Schriften des Freundeskreises Max Klinger. Deutscher Kunstverlag Berlin 2015. ISBN 978-3-422-07346-3, S. 148–164
