= Hinrich Lehmann-Grube =

German politician (1932–2017)

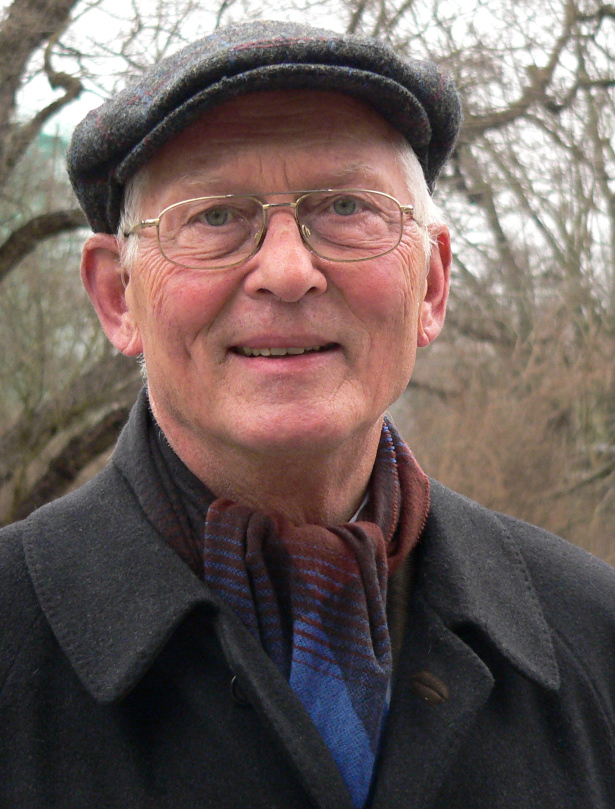

25th Mayor of Leipzig
- In office 1990 – 1 July 1998
- Preceded by: Günter Hädrich
- Succeeded by: Wolfgang Tiefensee

Personal details
- Born: 21 December 1932 Königsberg, Nazi Germany (present day Kaliningrad, Russia)
- Died: 6 August 2017 (aged 84) Leipzig, Germany
- Party: Social Democratic Party of Germany

Hinrich Lehmann-Grube (21 December 1932 – 6 August 2017) was a German politician. He served as Mayor of Leipzig from 1990 through 1998. He was a member of the Social Democratic Party of Germany. He was born in Königsberg (present day Kaliningrad, Russia).

== Life ==
Hinrich Lehmann-Grube was born in December 1932 as the son of the pediatrician Fritz Lehmann-Grube and his wife Elsa, née Lück. At the end of the Second World War, the family fled to Hamburg, where his mother came from. He finished school in 1951 with his Abitur in Hamburg and then studied law, interrupted by a six-month study stay at the Sorbonne in Paris. He passed both state examinations and received his doctorate in 1961.

In 1956, Lehmann-Grube became a member of the SPD. In 1957, he married Ursula Paproth. The couple had four children.

From 1957 to 1967, Lehmann-Grube worked in the head office of Deutscher Städtetag in Cologne. From 1967 to 1979, he was a councilor in the Cologne city administration. In 1979, he became the senior city manager of the city of Hanover, which has been a sister city of Leipzig since 23 November 1987.

In order to be able to participate as an SPD candidate in the GDR local elections on 6 May 1990 in Leipzig, Lehmann-Grube took on GDR citizenship in April 1990. He won his constituency and became a city councilor in Leipzig. On 6 June 1990, the city council elected him mayor. His term in office was characterized by the "Leipzig model", the alternative political attempt to solve problems across party and faction boundaries in a fact-oriented manner. In the direct elections of the mayor on 26 June 1994, he was confirmed in office by a large majority.

During Lehmann-Grube's term of office, the new exhibition center of the Leipzig Trade Fair was inaugurated in 1996 and the communities of Hartmannsdorf, Lausen, Plaußig and Seehausen were incorporated into Leipzig. On 30 June 1998, Lehmann-Grube retired and handed over the business to his party colleague and previous deputy Wolfgang Tiefensee, who had been elected as his successor, on 1 July 1998.

== Death ==
Lehmann-Grube died in Leipzig of cancer on 6 August 2017 at the age of 84.

== Honors ==
On 14 July 1999, Lehmann-Grube was made an honorary citizen of the city of Leipzig in recognition of his services as mayor from 1990 to 1998.

At its meeting on 24 January 2024, the Leipzig City Council decided to rename the part of Roßplatz with the Mägdebrunnen to Hinrich-Lehmann-Grube-Platz.

== See also ==
- List of Social Democratic Party of Germany politicians
