= List of mayors of Leipzig =

This is a list of mayors of Leipzig, until 1877, their title is Bürgermeister.

- 1701-1702 and 1703-1704: Franz Conrad Romanus

The list since 1778:

- 1778–1801: Carl Wilhelm Müller
- 1794–1813?: Christian Gottfried Hermann
- 1814–1830: Ludwig Ferdinand Weber
- 1831: Johann Carl Groß
- 1831: Dr. Carl Friedrich Schaarschmidt
- 1831–1839: Dr. Christian Adolph Deutrich
- 1840–1849: Dr. Johann Karl Groß
- 1848–1849: Hermann Adolph Klinger
- 1849–1876: Dr. Carl Wilhelm Otto Koch
- 1876–1899: Dr. jur. Dr. med. h.c. Otto Robert Georgi, since 1877 Oberbürgermeister
- 1899–1908: Dr. jur. et. phil. Carl Bruno Troendlin
- 1908–1917: Dr. Rudolf Bernhard August Dittrich
- 1918–1930: Dr. Karl Wilhelm August Rothe
- 1930–1937: Dr. Carl Friedrich Goerdeler
- 1937: Rudolf Haake (Acting)
- 1937–1938: Walter Dönicke
- 1938–1939: Rudolf Haake (Acting)
- 1939–1945: Alfred Freyberg
- 1945: Wilhelm Johannes Vierling
- 1945–1949: Richard Moritz Erich Zeigner
- 1949–1951: Max Ernst Opitz
- 1951–1959: Hans Erich Uhlich
- 1959–1970: Walter Kresse
- 1970–1986: Karl-Heinz Müller
- 1986–1989: Bernd Seidel
- 1989–1990: Günter Hädrich
- 1990–1998: Dr. Hinrich Lehmann-Grube
- 1998–2005: Wolfgang Tiefensee (SPD)
- 2005–2006: Andreas Müller (interim) (SPD)
- 2006–: Burkhard Jung (SPD)

== See also ==
- Timeline of Leipzig
