= Goerdelerring =

Street in Leipzig, Germany

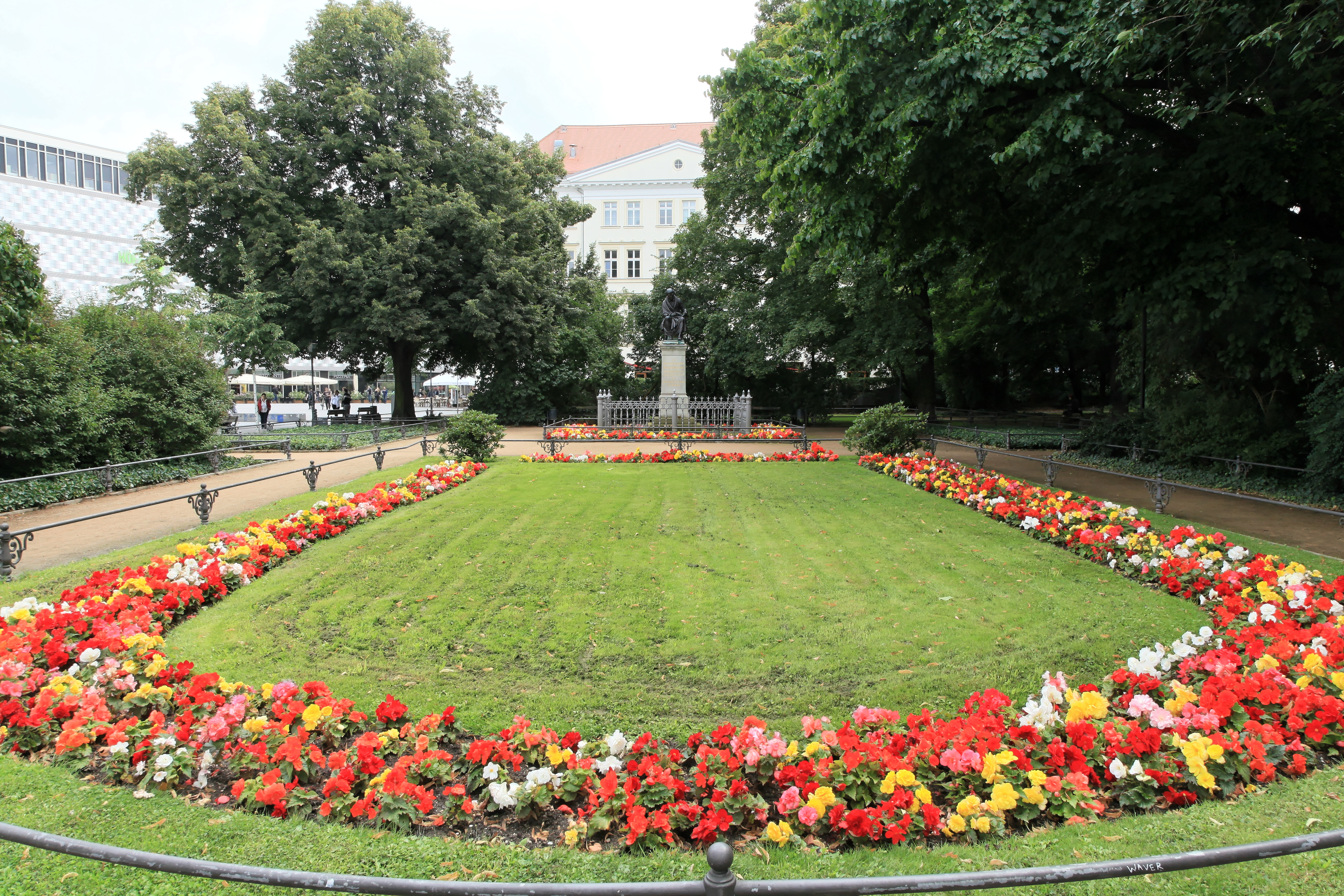
Park at Goerdelerring

Goerdelerring is a street and major tram interchange station in Leipzig, Germany. It is named after Carl Friedrich Goerdeler.

== The street ==
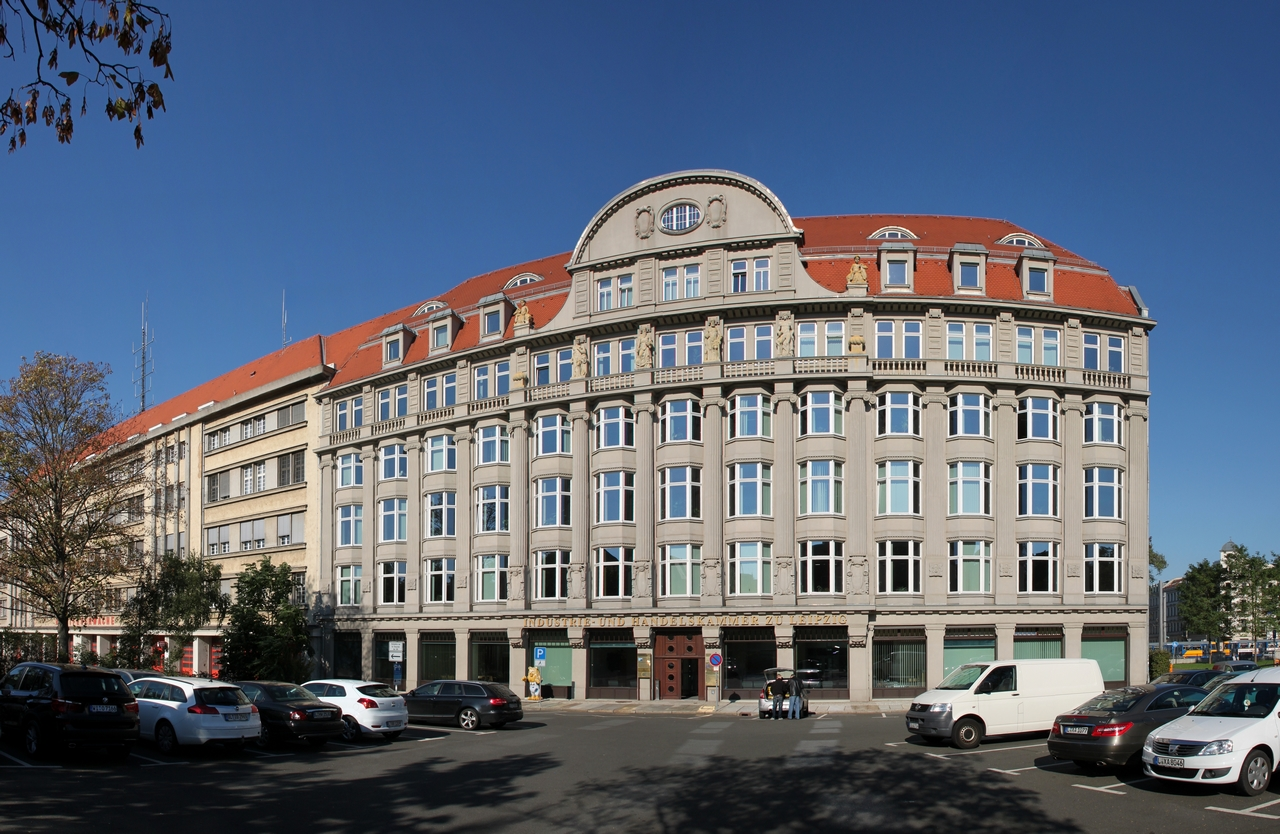
Leipzig chamber of industry and commerce

The street Goerdelerring is part of the inner city ring road of Leipzig, leading the traffic around the city center. It is 361 meters (1184 ft.) long and reaches from the branch of the Ranstädter Steinweg to the branch of the Käthe-Kollwitz-Straße in a mainly northeast-southwest direction. The street has three lanes for car traffic in each direction and two tracks for tramways in the middle which are also used by night busses. The first tramway tracks on the street that is now Goerdelerring have been laid in 1872 as part of the original horse tram network of the city of Leipzig.

There are no buildings immediately next to the street. Nevertheless, there are buildings with the address Goerdelerring. The most important one is the prior main firehouse, now Rescue station Mitte, the extensive refurbishment of which was completed in 2022. (Cost: 30.6 million euros) On the eastern side there is a small green area, as part of the green promenades ring, with the Richard Wagner Memorial and the school museum, on the western side the parking area of the firehouse and the Leipzig chamber of industry and commerce are situated. The continuation on the inner city ring road is made by the Dittrichring to the south and the Tröndlinring to the east. The crossing that forms the northern end of the Goerdelerring and the northwestern edge of the inner city ring road is one of the busiest crossings in Leipzig.

The construction of a 100 meters (330 ft.) high-rise building is possible on the Goerdelerring / Ranstädter Steinweg corner property. The opening of the Pleißemühlgraben (a canal) is also planned along the west side of the Goerdelerring.

Until 1945 the street was named Fleischerplatz, the northern crossing had the name Schulplatz. From 1945 to 1991 the whole street was named Friedrich-Engels-Platz after Friedrich Engels, and on 1 January 1992 the street got its current name Goerdelerring.

== The tramway station ==
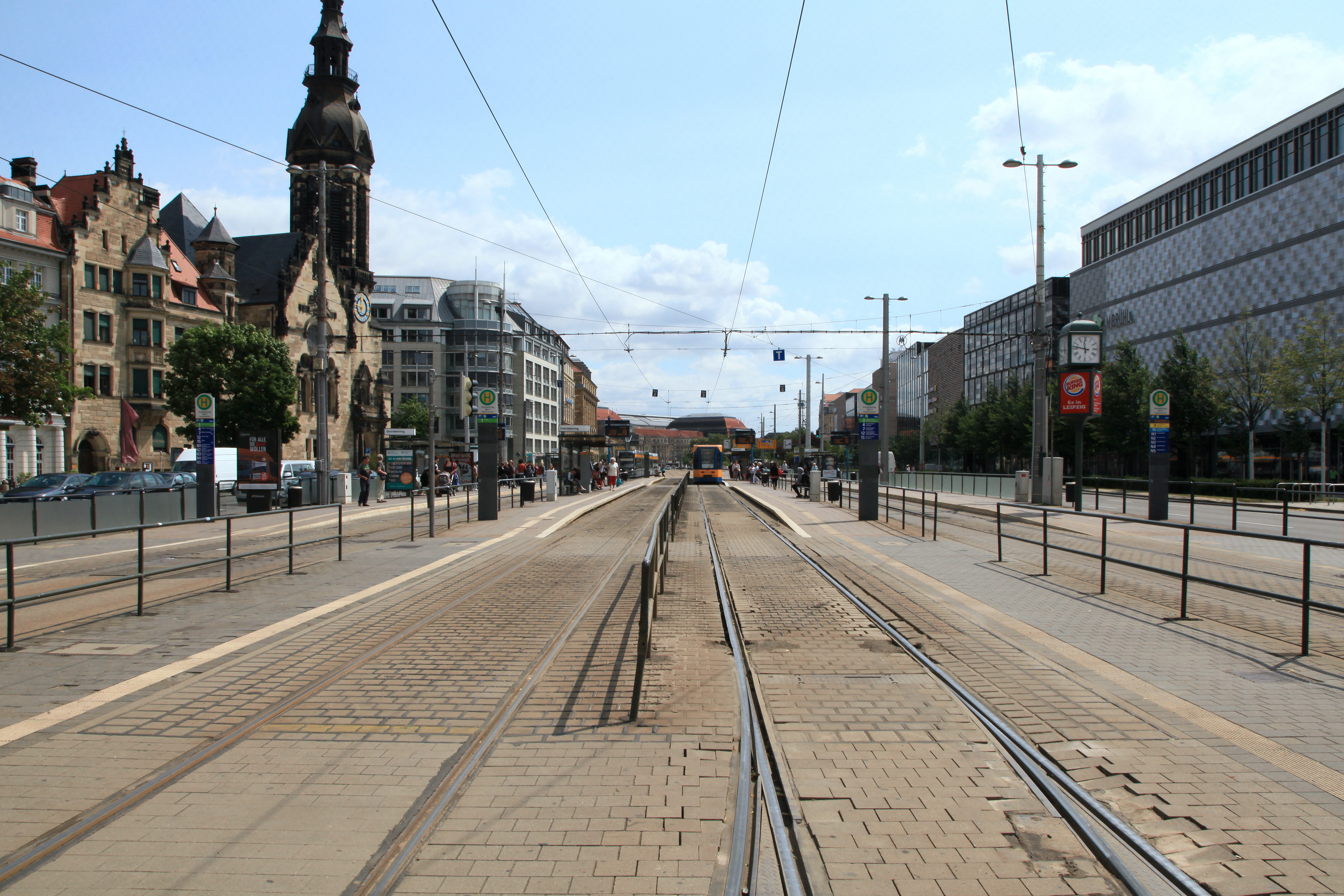
Tramway station Goerdelerring, looking towards Central Station, 2015

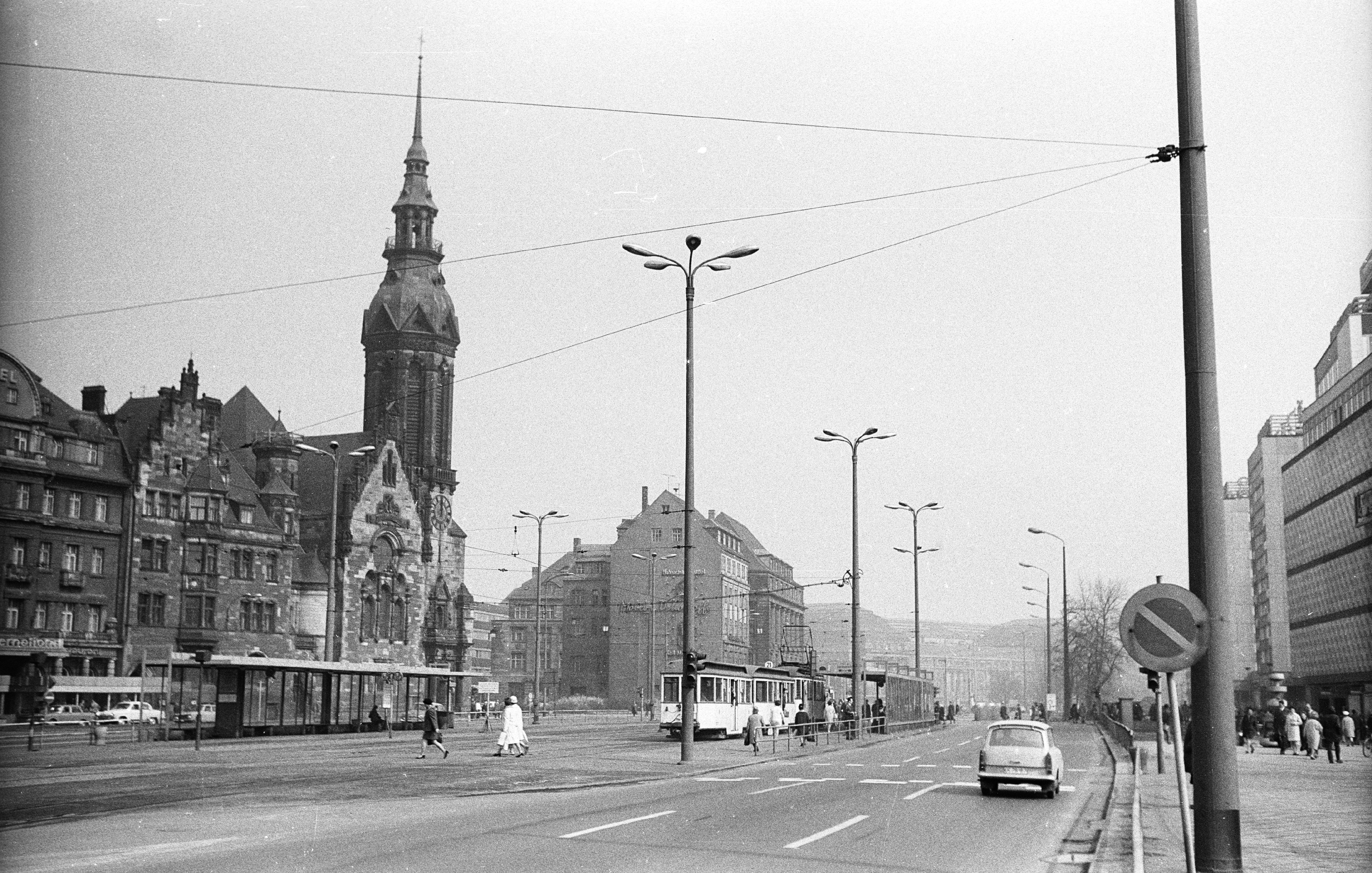
The same view in 1971

The tramway station Goerdelerring, served by the Leipzig Transport Company, is situated in the middle of the Tröndlinring, immediately east of the crossing that forms the northern end of the Goerdelerring. It was built in 1964 during a reconstruction of the alignment of the ring road. Until 1964 the tracks lay north of today's route nearer to the buildings. The street was widened and a large tramway station with four tracks has been built. Today, the tramway lines 1, 3, 4, 7, 9, 12, 14 and 15 and the nightbus lines N1, N2, N3, N4 and N5 are serving the station making it one of the busiest tramway stations in Leipzig. On weekdays 87 trams per hour stop at Goerdelerring which means in average one tram every 42 seconds.The number of people boarding and alighting before 2020 was 12,300 daily.

In 2020, the tramway station was renovated for 18 million euros.

== History ==
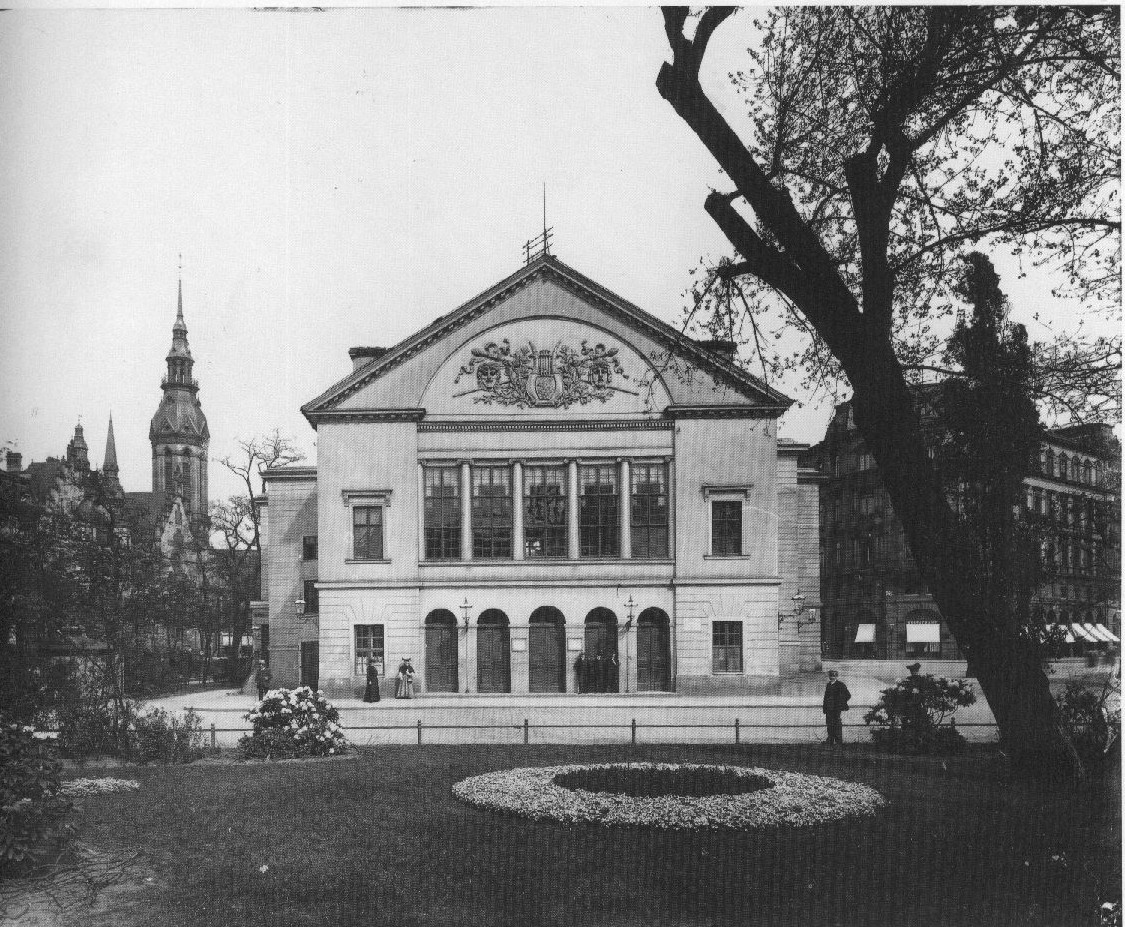
Old Theater Leipzig past 1899

The Theaterplatz with the Old Theater was on the site of today's tramway station Gordelerring. The theater, large enough for 1200 spectators, stood here in the midst of greenery from 1766 to 1943 and was destroyed during the Allied air raids on Leipzig. From 1718 to 1869 there was also a riding house in the Baroque style on the Theaterplatz. The tramway station is where the Hallesche Zwinger (The Halle outer bailey) once stood, the Goerdelerring where the Ranstädter Zwinger (The Ranstädt outer bailey) was. The areas between the higher and the lower wall of the former city fortifications were called Zwinger (outer baileys). Friedrich Gottlob Leonhardi wrote in 1799 that "in these outer baileys one could still walk around the whole city". The slaughterhouses on the Pleiße (from 1655 until 1891) and an old fire station (from 1865 until 1880 a half-timbered house and predecessor of today’s fire station) were located on the Fleischerplatz. (Fleischer means butcher) According to Leonhardi, there was also a Pentecost pasture in front of the Ranstädt Town Gate in the area of today's Goerdelerring, where the Leipzig rifle club "used to hold a large annual bird shooter with crossbows, which, however, for the benefit of many residents, has not been held for several years."

== Miscellaneous ==
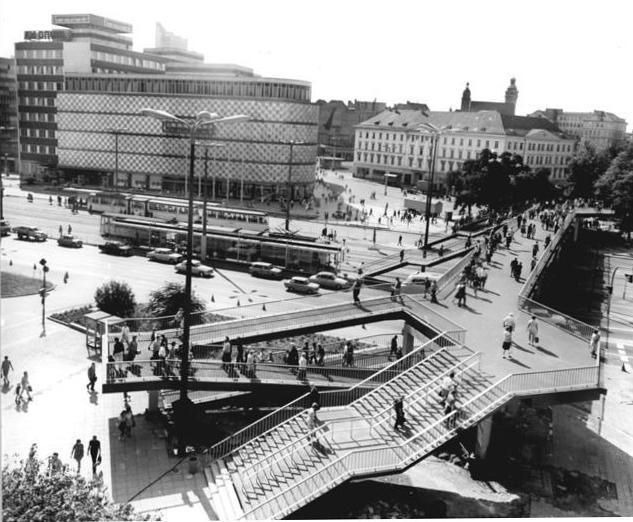
Pedestrian bridge Blaues Wunder (1973)

In 1920, a construction site along today's Goerdelerring was even reserved for a 345 feet tall trade-fair tower. It was to have thirty exhibition floors, each 196 feet wide. The City Council voted scarcely against it.

From 1973 to 2004, the pedestrian bridge called Blaues Wunder (blue wonder) crossed the Goerdelerring / Tröndlinring intersection.

== See also ==
- List of tallest buildings in Leipzig
- List of streets and squares in Leipzig
