= Johann Carl Friedrich Dauthe =

German architect (1746–1816)

Johann Carl Friedrich Dauthe (26 September 1746 – 13 July 1816) was a German architect and etcher who specialised in the Neo-Classical style.

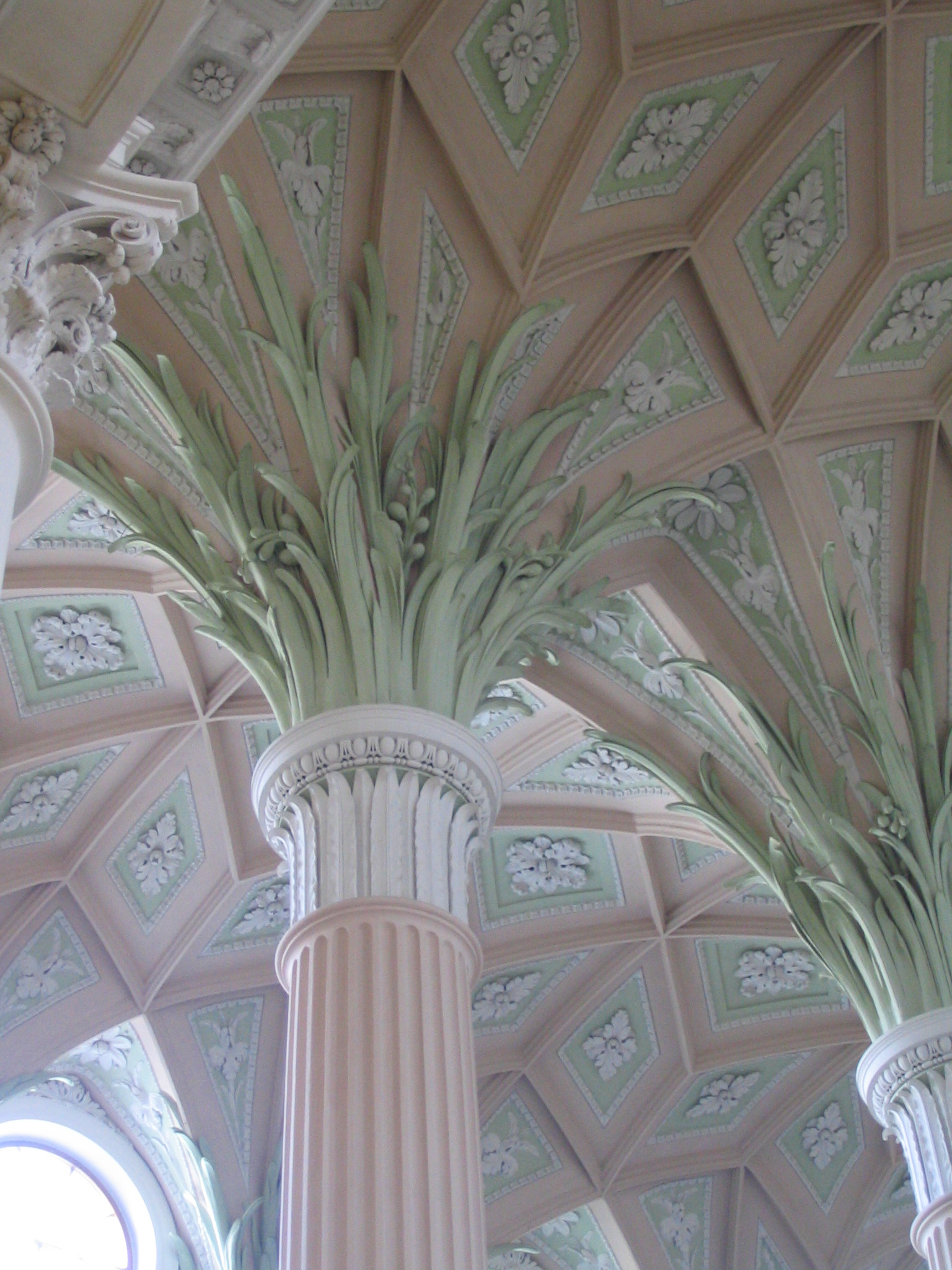
Nikolai Church column detail

Dauthe was born in Leipzig and educated by Adam Friedrich Oeser. In his hometown, where he had been the city's construction official most of his buildings have been built, such as the first concert chamber of the Gewandhaus (1781), the square now known as the Augustusplatz (1785) and the interior of the St. Nicholas Church (1794). Dauthe became member of the Lodge Minerva zu den drei Palmen Leipzig in 1778. He died at the age of 69 in the small Silesian city of Bad Flinsberg.

== See also ==
- Promenadenring (Leipzig)
