= Stephan Balkenhol =

German artist (born 1957)

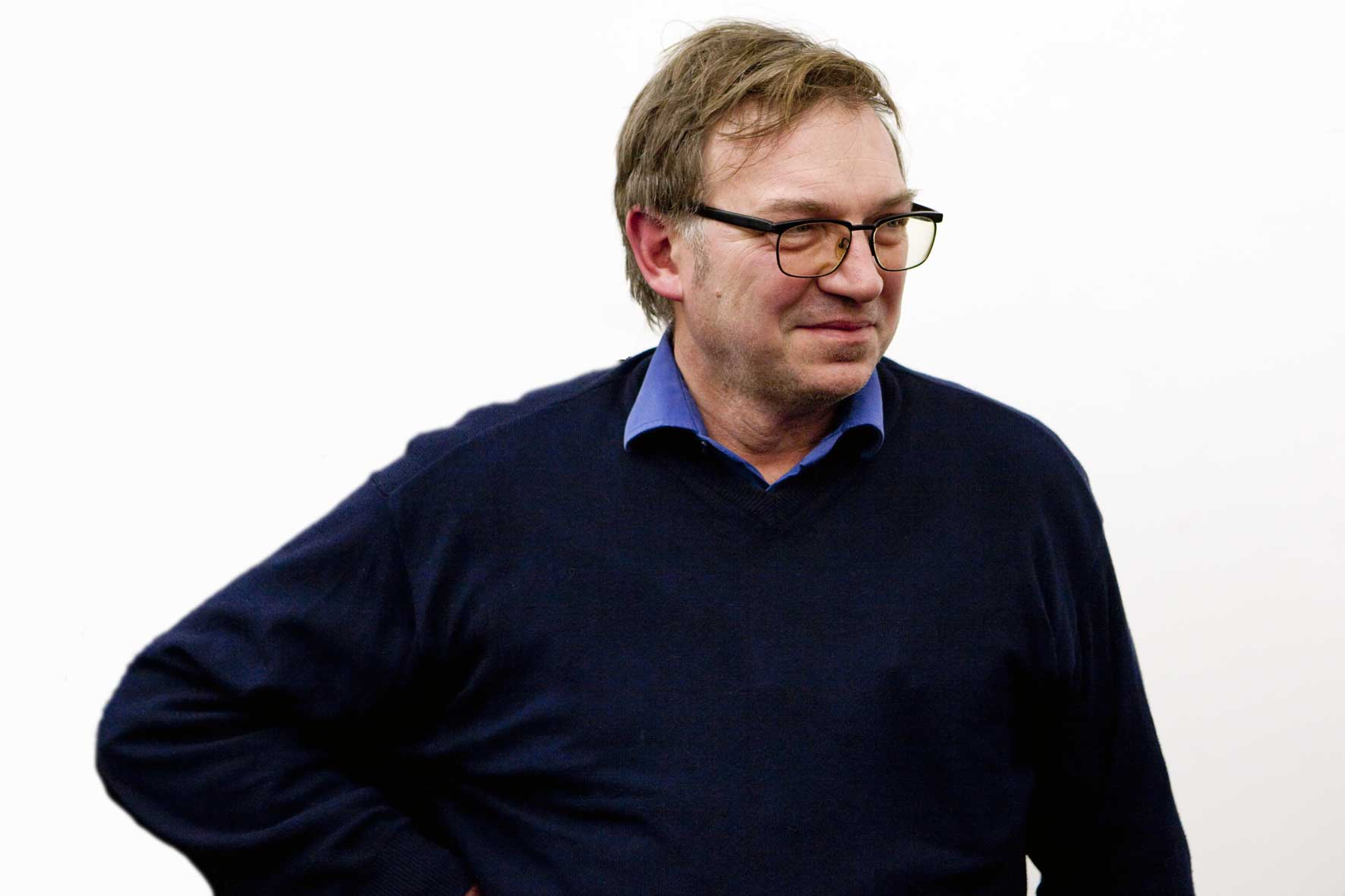
- Balkenhol in 2010
- Born: 1957 (age 68–69); Fritzlar, Hesse, West Germany
- Education: University of Fine Arts of Hamburg
- Style: Figurative art

Stephan Balkenhol (born 1957) is a German artist who creates figurative painted wooden sculptures and reliefs.

== Early life ==
Balkenhol was born in 1957 in Fritzlar, Hesse.

== Career ==
He is currently a professor of sculpture at the State Academy of Fine Arts Karlsruhe (Germany). He lives and works in Karlsruhe, Germany, and Meisenthal, France.

=== Artistic style ===
Balkenhol's work adopts a figurative artistic style, which typically depicts people in a neutral, objective way by removing socio-critical references.

Balkenhol uses a variety of woods, such as poplar, Douglas fir, and wawa wood. He hand-carves each piece from a single block. He uses paint to structure the sculpture.

== Artist's public installations ==
Balkenhol has completed a number of public commissions in his career. Among them are the “Big Head Column” for the Peggy Guggenheim Collection (Venice, Italy), “Big Man with a Little Man” for Pariser Platz (Berlin, Germany), “Man and Woman” for Hamburg Central Library (Hamburg, Germany), “Everyman” for the Edinburgh City Council Offices (Edinburgh, Scotland) and “Toronto Man” (Toronto, Canada).

'Man on Giraffe'

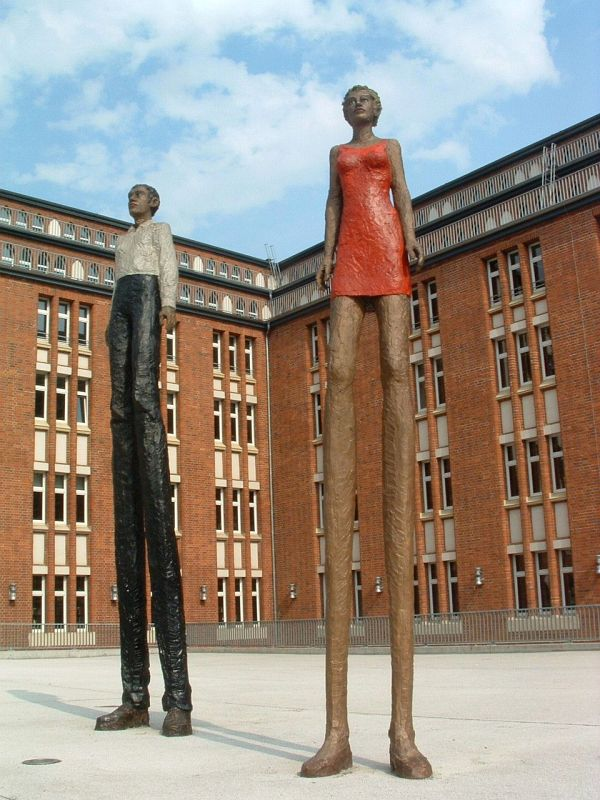
"Man + Woman" in Hamburg in front of the Central Library of the Hamburger Öffentliche Bücherhallen

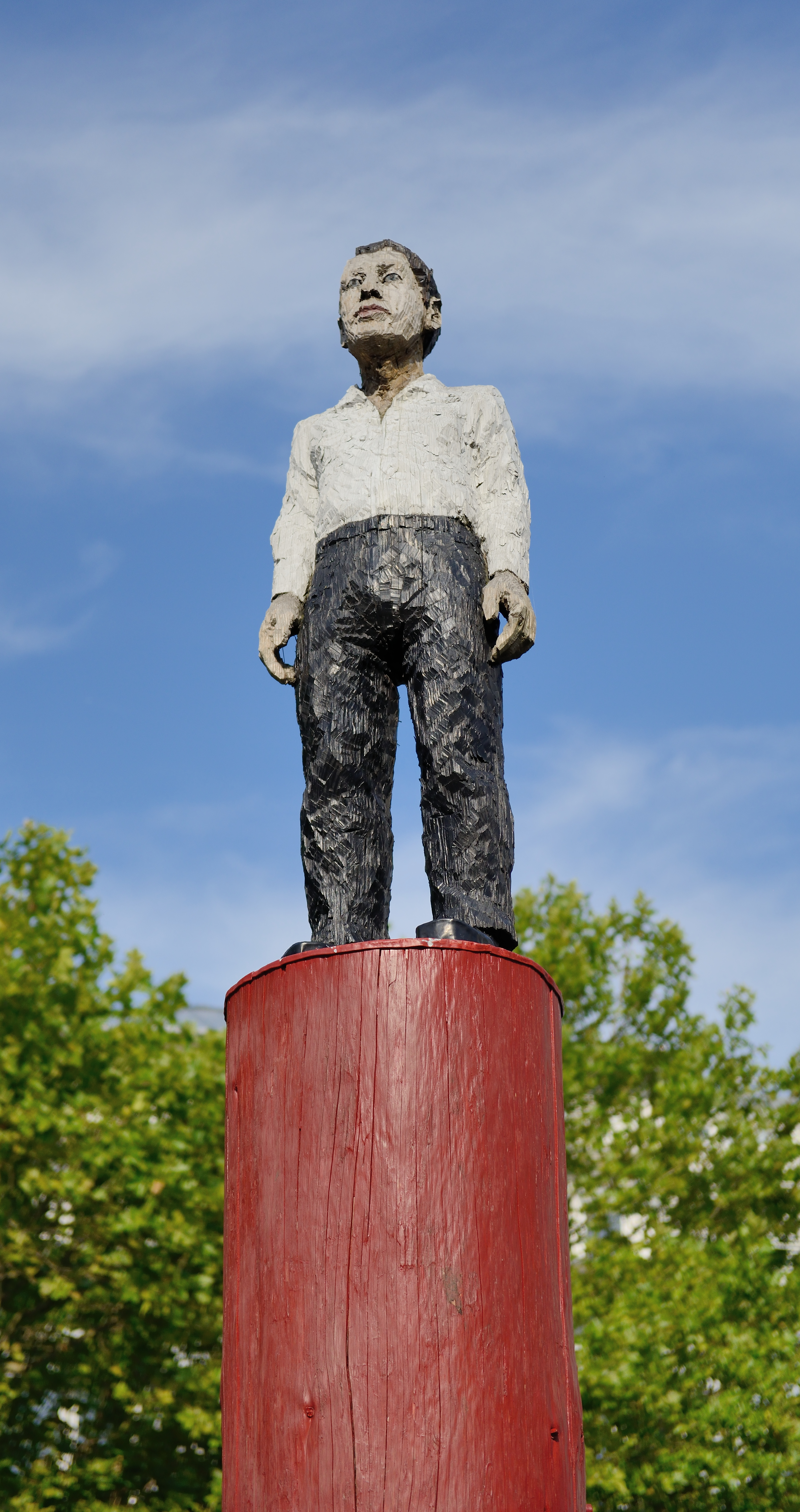
Large column figure in Lörrach

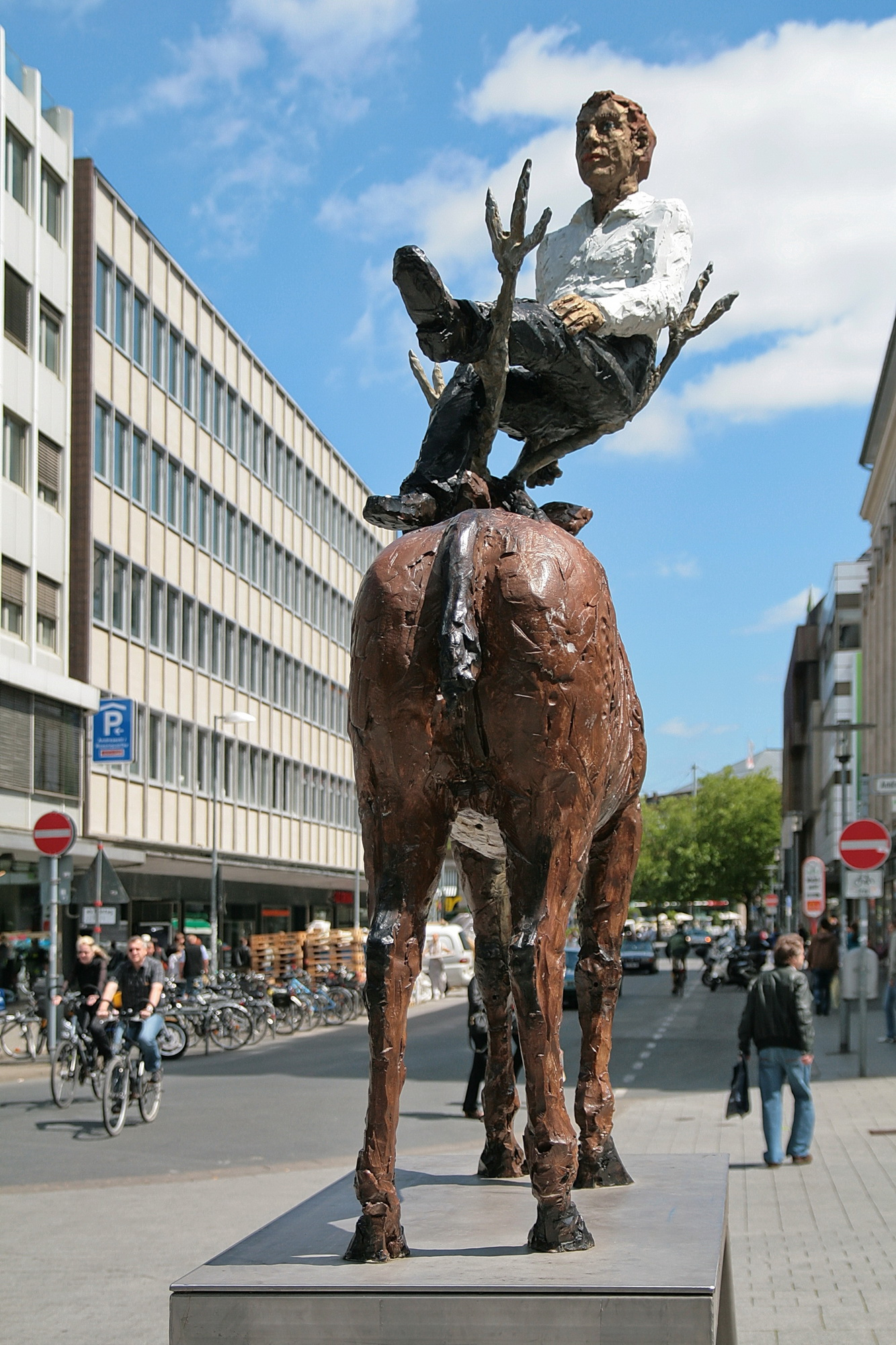
"Man with deer" in Hanover, Lower Saxony, Germany
