= Albrecht Kurzwelly =

German historian

Albrecht Alexander August Kurzwelly (20 January 1868 – 8 January 1917) was a German art historian, Volkskundler and founding director of the Stadtgeschichtliches Museum Leipzig.

== Life ==
Kurzwelly was born in 1868 in Leipzig as the son of the physician Martin Liberatus Kurzwelly (1831-1882) from Chemnitz and his wife Thekla Caecilie, née Heinig. From 1878 until 1888, this talented boy, who was gifted in music and drawing, attended the Thomasschule zu Leipzig, where especially Heinrich Stürenburg and Friedrich Eduard König had a strong influence on his intellectual development. After graduating from high school, he studied theology and from 1889 philosophy and art history at the University of Leipzig and the Ludwig-Maximilians-Universität München as a student of Anton Springer, Wilhelm Heinrich Riehl, Moritz Carrière, Johannes Overbeck, Hubert Janitschek, Karl Lamprecht. In 1894, Kurzwelly received his doctorate thanks to a work published by August Schmarsow with a monograph about the painter and Dürerschüler Georg Pencz

Under the authority of Melchior zur Straßen and his successor Richard Graul, he worked as an assistant from 1895 until 1904 and from 1904 until 1909 as a deputy director at the Kunstgewerbemuseum Leipzig. During this time, he made great contributions to the research of local art history. He was intensively engaged in the life and work of Leipzig painters and illustrators as well as in the history of the origin of Leipzig buildings and made an important contribution to the research of the history of old Thuringian porcelain. Kurzwelly also wrote articles for Thiemes Künstlerlexikon and published regularly articles in art scientific journals.

From 1895 until 1915, he was also a lecturer for art history at the Hochschule für Grafik und Buchkunst Leipzig, where he especially tried to arouse the students' interest for the Medailleur art of the Renaissance period.

In 1901, he was elected to the board of the Leipzig Historical Society, whose extensive collections in the rooms of the old Johannishospital he now looked after and researched. When this collection became the property of the city of Leipzig in 1909, he was commissioned by the city fathers to draw up a plan for the design of a museum of city history, which was to be housed in the Renaissance building of the Altes Rathaus, which had been empty since 1905. For the five rooms available, Kurzwelly designed a thematic presentation concept instead of a chronological one with the main focuses: Political history, communal and social life, economic culture, intellectual culture and private life.

On 1 January 1910, Kurzwelly was appointed director of the museum to be built. In addition to the practical implementation of his museum concept, the expansion of the collection holdings and the organisation of special exhibitions were the main focuses of his activities. He placed particular emphasis on the acquisition of material to commemorate the Battle of Leipzig as well as evidence of the economic, intellectual and musical development of his hometown. From the most diverse public and private collections, he brought together the antiquities in the rooms of the Old Town Hall and created a picture of urban culture, as only few German cities are able to present it more clearly and comprehensively.

Highlights of his museum activities were the special exhibitions on Leipziger Bildnismalerei von 1700 bis 1850 (from 9 June to 28 July 1912), the great Richard Wagner Memorial exhibition (May 1913) as well as the Jahrhundertausstellung zur Leipziger Völkerschlacht (July 1913).

In 1914, he made a study on Bach's portraits, in which he investigated the origin and credibility of all Bach portraits and their copies.

Shortly after the opening of the last department of the Stadtgeschichtliches Museum, which he had developed, the art historian and quiet patron of young artists and artisans, who worked tirelessly in spite of a severe gall and heart disease, died of a stroke in January 1917 at the age of 49. With great sympathy, the unmarried man was buried in the family grave of the V. Abteilung of the Neuer Johannisfriedhof in Leipzig.

From everything he did, there was a reverence for the witnesses of an important past and a faithful love for his hometown.

== Awards ==
- 1908: Saxe-Ernestine House Order, Knight's Cross I. Classe
- 1912: Königlich-sächsischer Professorentitel
- 1915: Königlich-sächsischer Albert Order, Knight's Cross I. Classe
- 1917: Order of Philip the Magnanimous, Knight's Cross I. Classe
