= Friedrich Schulze =

Friedrich Schulze may refer to:

- Friedrich Schulze (architect)
- Friedrich Schulze (historian)

== See also ==
- Friedrich Schulz (disambiguation)
