= Schillerhaus (Leipzig) =

Former home of author Friedrich Schiller

Coordinates: 51°21′32″N 12°21′46″E

- Schillerhaus
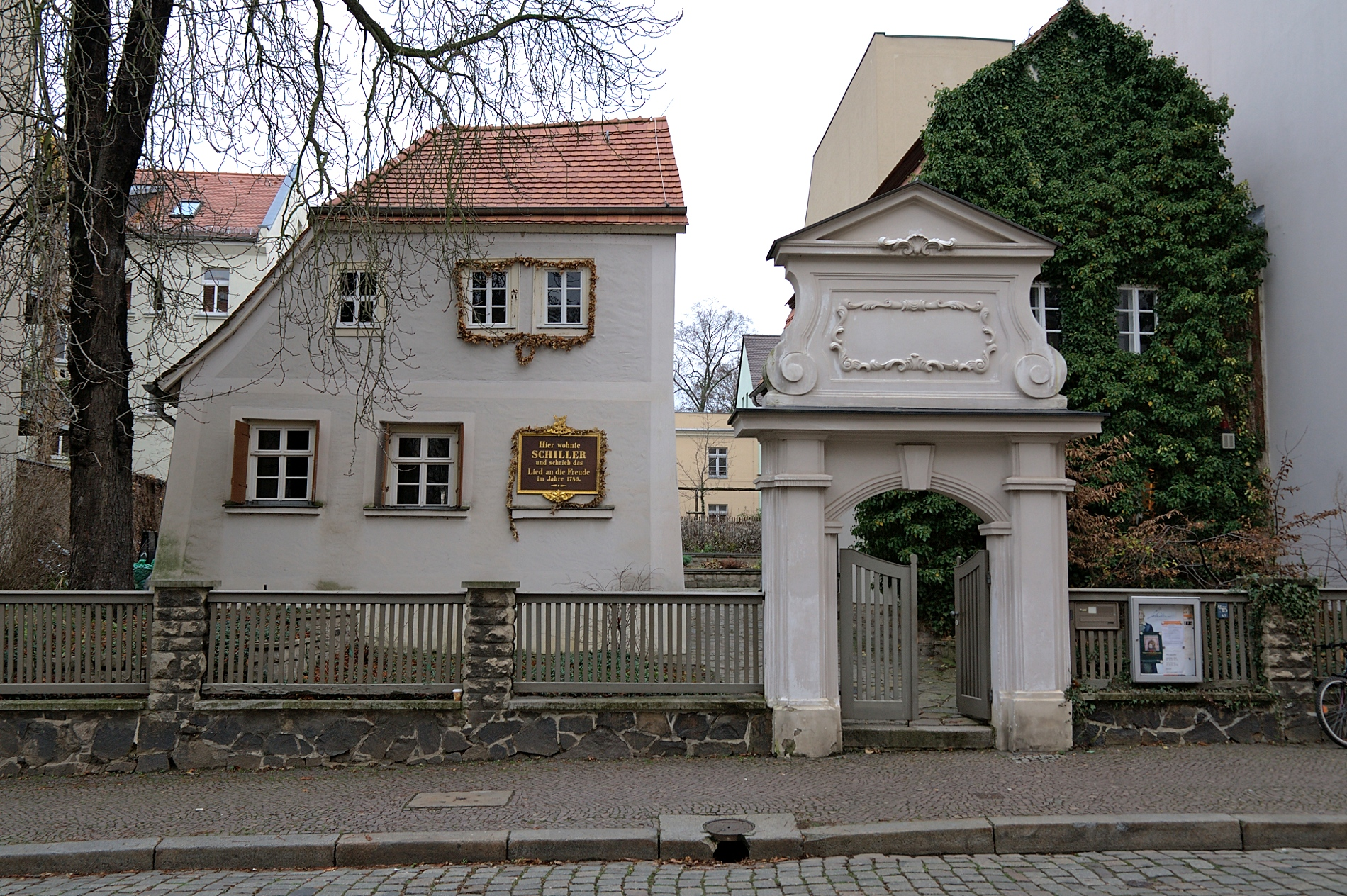
- Schillerhaus (2009)
- Type: Historic house museum, Biographical museum
- Public transit access: Trams in Leipzig, Line 4, Tram stop Menckestrasse
- Website: www.stadtgeschichtliches-museum-leipzig.de/en/visit/our-museums/schiller-house/

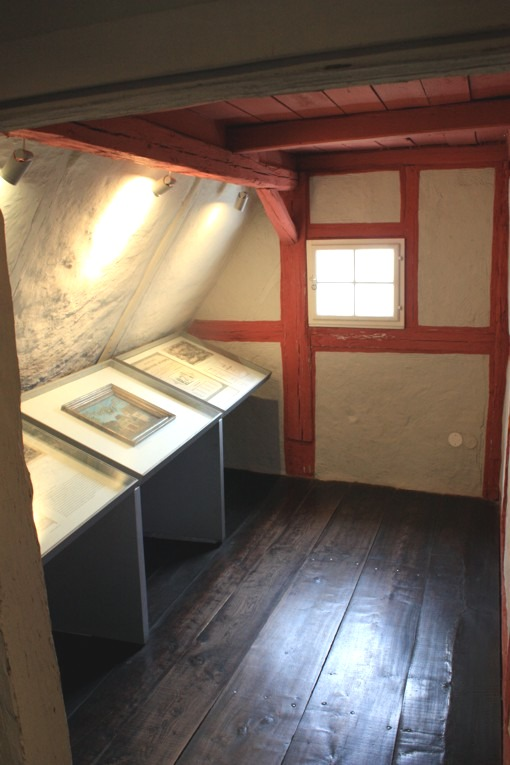
Exhibition inside the Schillerhaus

The Schillerhaus is a small former farmhouse in the Leipzig district of Gohlis (Menckestraße 42). Friedrich Schiller lived on the upper floor of the house in the summer of 1785. He worked here on the 2nd act of Don Carlos, edited the Fiesco and wrote the first version of the poem "An die Freude", which he later completed in Dresden.

== Museum ==
The building is the oldest preserved farmhouse in the Leipzig city area and a memorial that is a branch of the Leipzig City History Museum. The house's exhibition, consisting of about 100 pieces, is dedicated to the literary works and Leipzig theatrical performances of the famous poet. The Schillerhaus presents the poet's connection with Leipzig, and brilliantly recreates an 18th-century Saxon interior. During the summer months, theater performances, concerts or readings take place in the cottage garden named Schillergarten.

== History of the building ==
=== The first years of the house ===
The building was built in 1717 as a single-storey main house (housebarn) of a small-scale Dreiseithof in the former village of Gohlis from clay using a cob construction. It consisted of a living area, a hall (black kitchen) and a stable. In the second half of the 18th century, the building was redesigned to create additional quarters for summer guests. The stable was rebuilt and the building increased.

=== Schiller's time in the Schillerhaus ===
The then 25-year-old Schiller lived from 7 May to 11 September 1785 in the upper floor of the house. The visit followed an invitation from the circle of friends around the lawyer Christian Gottfried Körner. At the same time, the publisher Georg Joachim Göschen, who had arranged the accommodation for Schiller, lived in the building's former stable section. During his time in Leipzig, Schiller worked on the second act of Don Carlos, edited Fiesco and wrote the first version of the poem An die Freude.

=== Rediscovery and effect of the Schiller Club ===
In 1841, on the initiative of Robert Blum, Leipzig theater secretary and one of the pioneers of the German Revolution of 1848/49, the Schillerhaus was rediscovered as Schiller's place of work, after which a memorial was set up. It was inaugurated on 11 November 1841 with the solemn unveiling of the newly built honor gate with the memorial plaque "This is where Schiller lived and wrote the song to joy in 1785". On 24 October 1842 the Leipzig Schiller Club was established/founded by Robert Blum. In 1848 the Schillerstube was opened to the public. In 1856 the house was threatened with demolition and auction, whereupon the Schillerverein acquired the building for 2150 thalers through donations and the financial commitment of a board member. This board member was the historian Heinrich Wuttke. Over the next three years, the building and its outdoor facilities underwent decisive structural changes. In 1864 the entry in the land register was made on the Schiller Club. According to the statutes, when the association was dissolved, the house became the property of the city if the city agreed to use the building as a memorial. In the years 1896/97, 1911 and 1929–34, further structural repair and redesign work was carried out. In 1911 the architect Max Langheinrich rebuilt the gate of honor according to the old view. On 4 December 1943 a stick bomb broke through the roof during the bombing of the city and got stuck in Schiller's former bedroom. This bomb could be removed. As a result, valuable exhibits were relocated to the Wurzen Cathedral, some of which are considered a war loss.

=== The Schiller House during the GDR era ===
In 1949, the state government of Saxony dissolved the Schiller Association and made the Schiller House subordinate to the Kulturbund. The city of Leipzig now owned the building. In 1961 the Schillerhaus became a branch of the Leipzig City History Museum. In the years 1966–69 and 1985–89, further repairs to the castellan's house (ancillary building), the main house and a redesign of the courtyard and garden took place, which considerably impaired the historical appearance and irretrievably removed the historical plaster structure and coloristic design.

=== The Schiller House after the German reunification ===
In 1995 the Schillerhaus had to be closed due to the risk of collapse. In 1997/98, extensive building archaeological and restoration investigations followed with public and private funds, with subsequent conservation and restoration. On 28 October 1998 the Schillerhaus was able to reopen. In 2002 the gardens were redesigned as a farm garden based on the historical model.

In April 2023, after several months of closure, the Schillerhaus reopened with a revised permanent exhibition titled Götterfunke.

== See also ==
- Architecture of Leipzig - Baroque era

== Literature ==
- Volker Rodekamp (Ed.): The Schiller House in Leipzig-Gohlis. Stadtgeschichtliches Museum, Leipzig 1998, ISBN 3-7950-3905-3 .
- The Schiller Festival in Leipzig . In: Illustrirte Zeitung . No. 24 . J. J. Weber, Leipzig, 9 December 1843, p. 377-378 (books.google.de).
- Sabine Hocquel-Schneider: Repair and restoration of the Schiller House in Leipzig. In: State Office for the Preservation of Monuments in Saxony (ed.): Preservation of monuments in Saxony. Communications from the State Office for the Preservation of Monuments 1999.fly head, Halle (Saale) 1999, pp. 102–110.
