= Friedrich Schulze (historian) =

German historian (1881-1960)

Friedrich Karl Alfred Schulze (20 April 1881 – 28 August 1960) was a German historian and director of the Stadtgeschichtliches Museum Leipzig.

== Life ==
Born in Weimar, Schulze was born as the son of a master baker and took his Abitur at the Domgymnasium Naumburg. He then studied at the universities in Jena and Leipzig, initially classical and Germanic philology, then, due to a change in his interests, history, German studies and philosophy. In 1903, he was awarded the title Die Gräfin Dolores. Ein Beitrag zur Geschichte des deutschen Geisteslebens im Zeitalter der Romantik and was awarded a doctorate in philology. In 1904, followed the examination for the higher Lehramt. During his student days, he found his way into the Freistudentenschaft or the local "Finkenschaft". He worked as a writer for the Leipzig Freistudentenschaft and wrote numerous articles in the freestudent press.

From 1904 to 1906 he worked as an assistant teacher at the Königin-Carola-Gymnasium and Alte Nikolaischule (Leipzig)-Gymnasium in Leipzig. From 1906 to 1911, he worked for the B. G. Teubner Verlag, about which he published a work on the history of the company and wrote chapters I to V. From 1913; he was involved in the establishment of the newly founded city museum in Leipzig. Schulze was also active as a freelance writer and wrote, for example, articles for the Allgemeine Lexikon der Bildenden Künstler von der Antike bis zur Gegenwart.

When Albrecht Kurzwelly died in 1917 as a result of a war injury, Schulze took over his position as 2nd head of the board of the Stadtgeschichtliches Museum. In 1918, he took over the position of the museum director and was its director until 1945. From 1928 to 1938, Schulze was also chairman of the Leipziger Geschichtsverein.

Written jointly with Paul Ssymank, Das deutsche Studententum von den ältesten Zeiten bis zur Gegenwart is still considered a standard work on student history today.

Schulze died in Halle at the age of 79.

== Publications ==
- Friedrich Karl Alfred Schulze (1904). Albert Köster (ed.). "Die Gräfin Dolores. Ein Beitrag zur Geschichte des deutschen Geisteslebens im Zeitalter der Romantik". Probefahrten – Erstlingsarbeiten aus dem Deutschen Seminar Leipzig. Leipzig: R. Voigtländer.
- Friedrich Schulze (1908). "Die Franzosenzeit in deutschen Landen 1806–1815 in Wort und Bild der Mitlebenden". Leipzig: R. Voigtländer. OCLC 560538002.
- Friedrich Schulze, ed. (1911). B. G. Teubner 1811–1911. Geschichte der Firma in deren Auftrag. Wiesbaden: Vieweg+Teubner Verlag. doi:10.1007/978-3-663-19245-9. ISBN 978-3-663-18984-8. S2CID 160795030.
- Friedrich Schulze, ed. (1912). Die ersten deutschen Eisenbahnen Nürnberg-Fürth und Leipzig-Dresden. Voigtländers Quellenbücher. Leipzig: Voigtländer.
- Der deutsche Buchhandel und die geistigen Strömungen der letzten hundert Jahre. Verlag des Börsenvereins der deutschen Buchhändler, Leipzig 1925 (Leseprobe, books.google.col).
- Friedrich Schulze (1934). Deutsche Bibeln vom ältesten Bibeldruck bis zur Lutherbibel. Leipzig: Bibliographisches Institut. OCLC 608931087.
