= Leipzig City History Museum =

- Stadtgeschichtliches Museum Leipzig

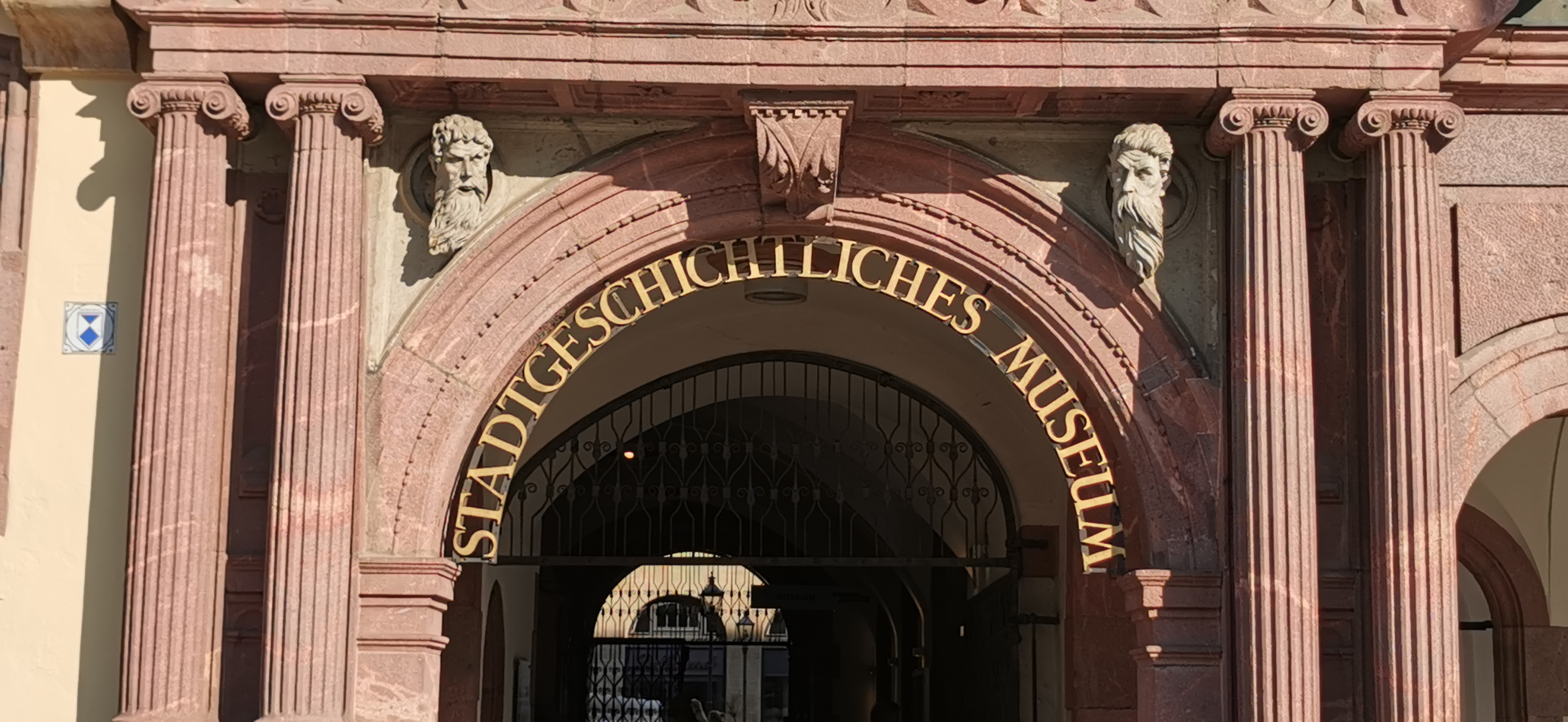
- Inscription at the entrance (Old Town Hall)
- Established: 1909 (permanent home)
- Location: Leipzig, Germany
- Type: History Museum
- Visitors: 550,000 (2024)
- Director: Anselm Hartinger
- Owner: City of Leipzig
- Public transit access: Leipzig Markt station
- Website: www.stadtgeschichtliches-museum-leipzig.de/en/

The Leipzig City History Museum, a municipal museum in Leipzig, Germany, collects, documents, and presents in its exhibitions objects, information, and contexts of Leipzig's history from its founding as a city in the early Middle Ages to the present day. With approximately 550,000 visitors annually (as of the end of 2024), the Leipzig City History Museum is one of Leipzig's most visited attractions.

The ring of decentralized themed museums is located around the central locations of the Old Town Hall and Haus Böttchergäßchen (known as the New Building until 2014). These include the Monument to the Battle of the Nations (Völkerschlachtdenkmal) and FORUM 1813, the Schillerhaus in Leipzig-Gohlis, the Museum Zum Arabischen Coffee Baum, the Alte Handelsbörse, the Capa House and the Sports Museum (currently without a permanent exhibition).

Overview of the different facilities

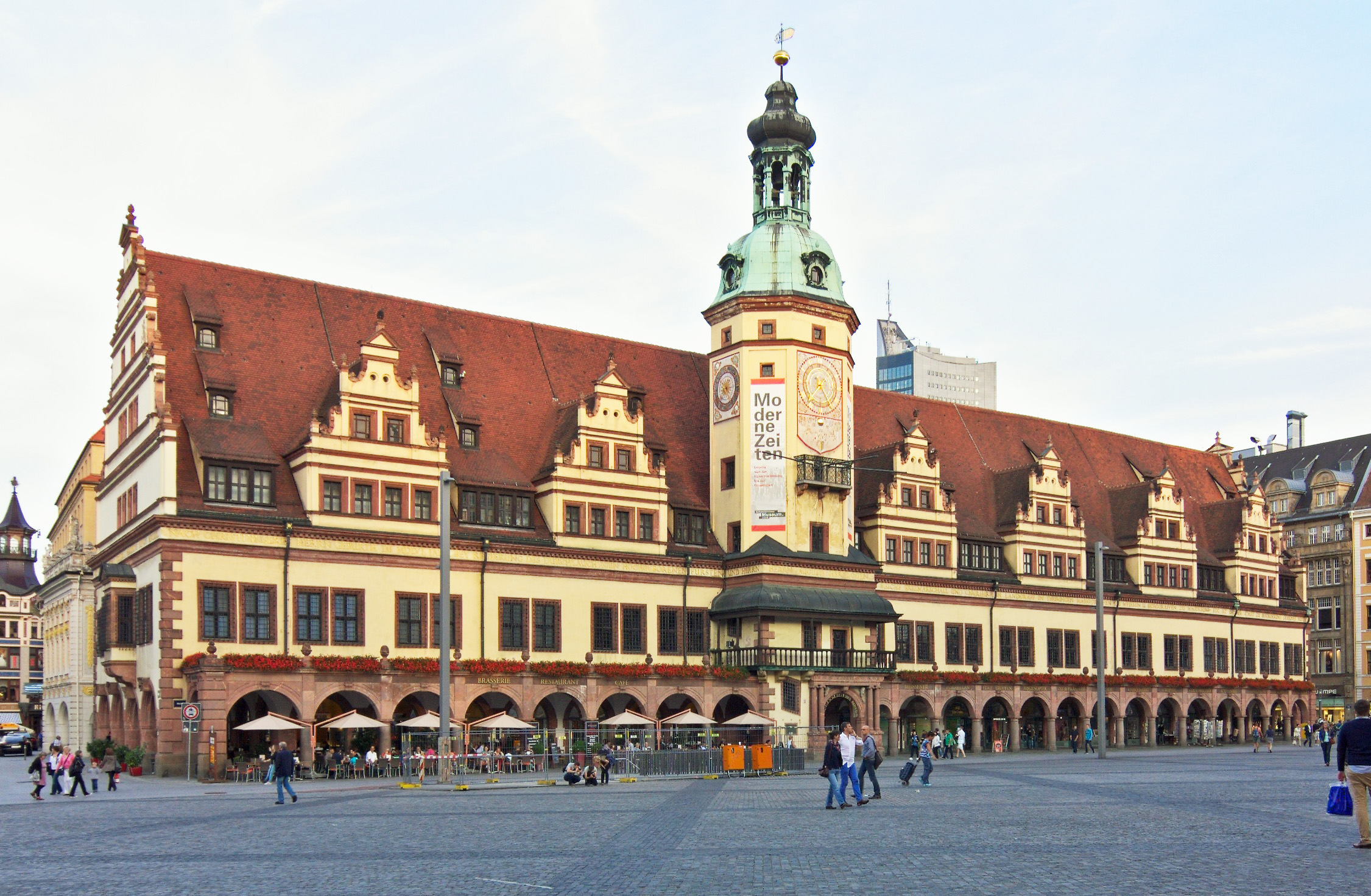
Old Town Hall

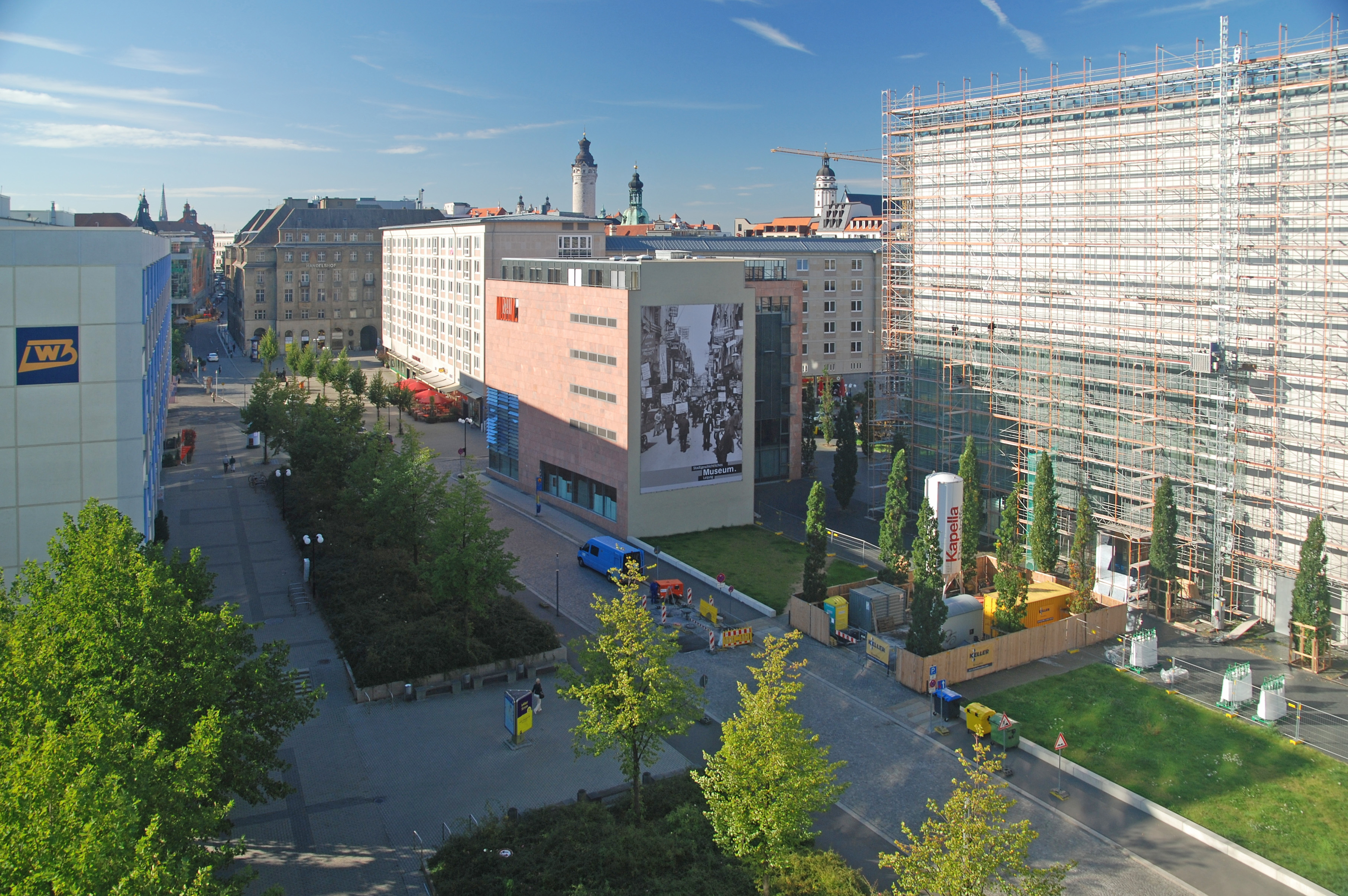
House Böttchergäßchen

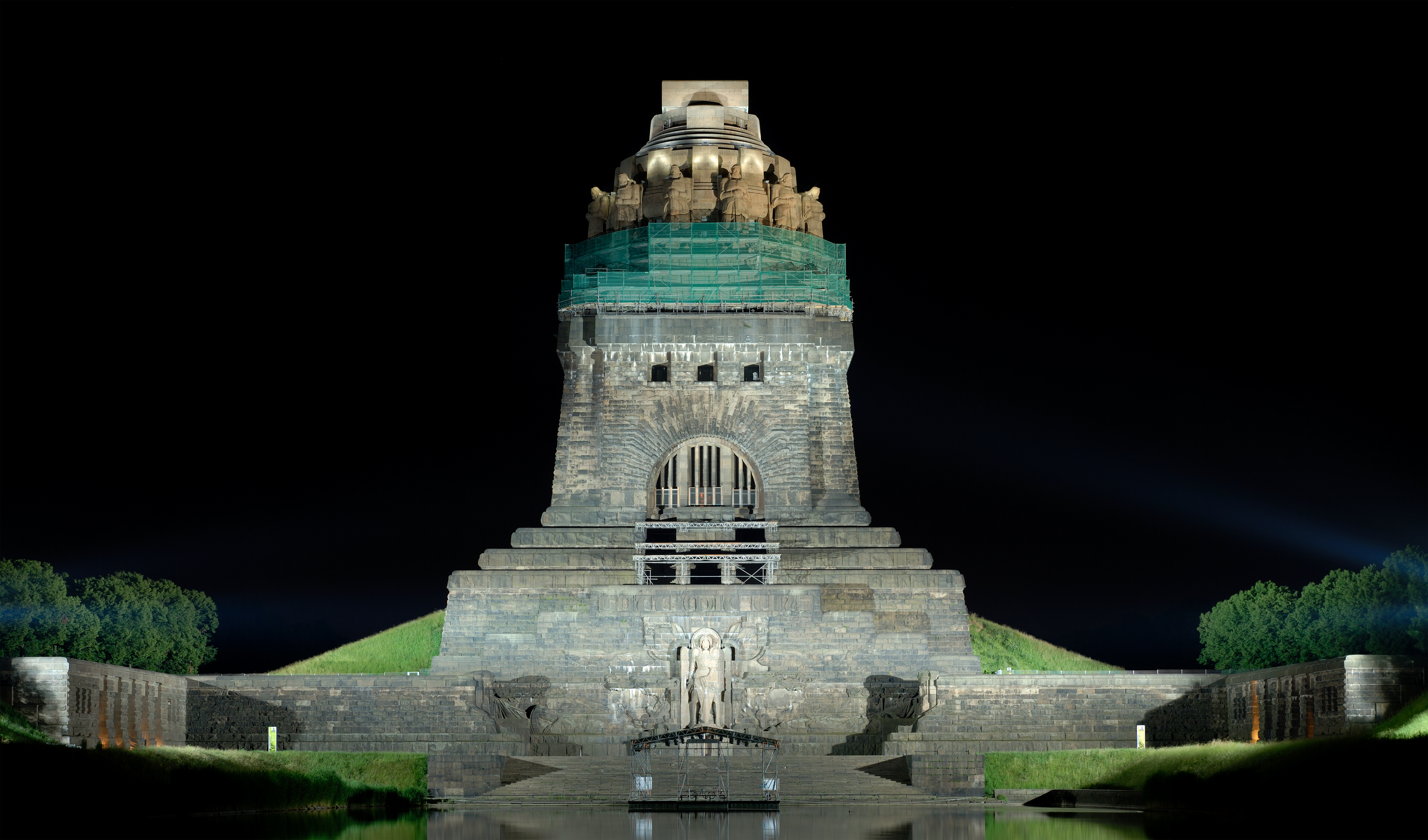
Monument to the Battle of the Nations

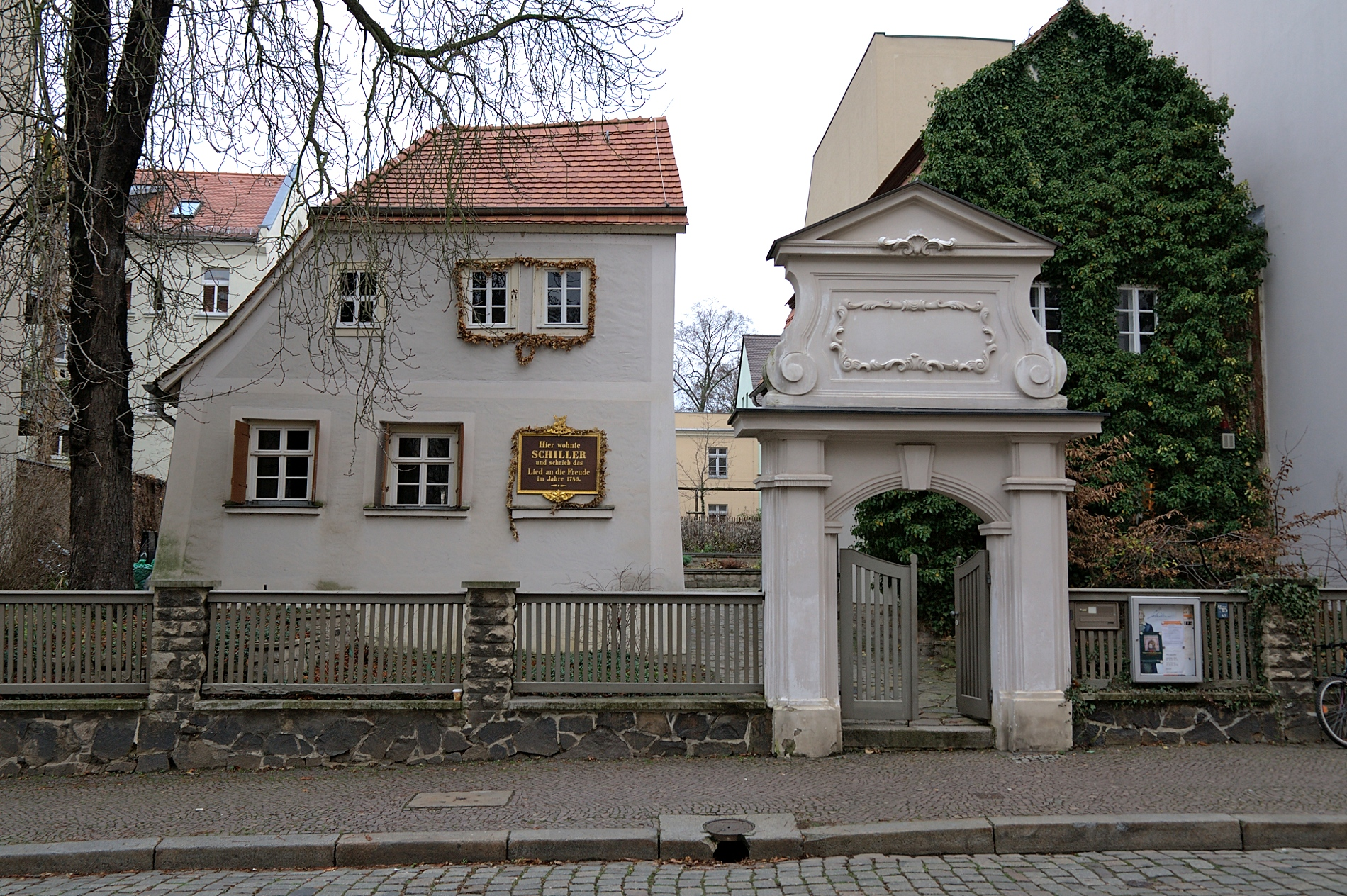
Schiller House

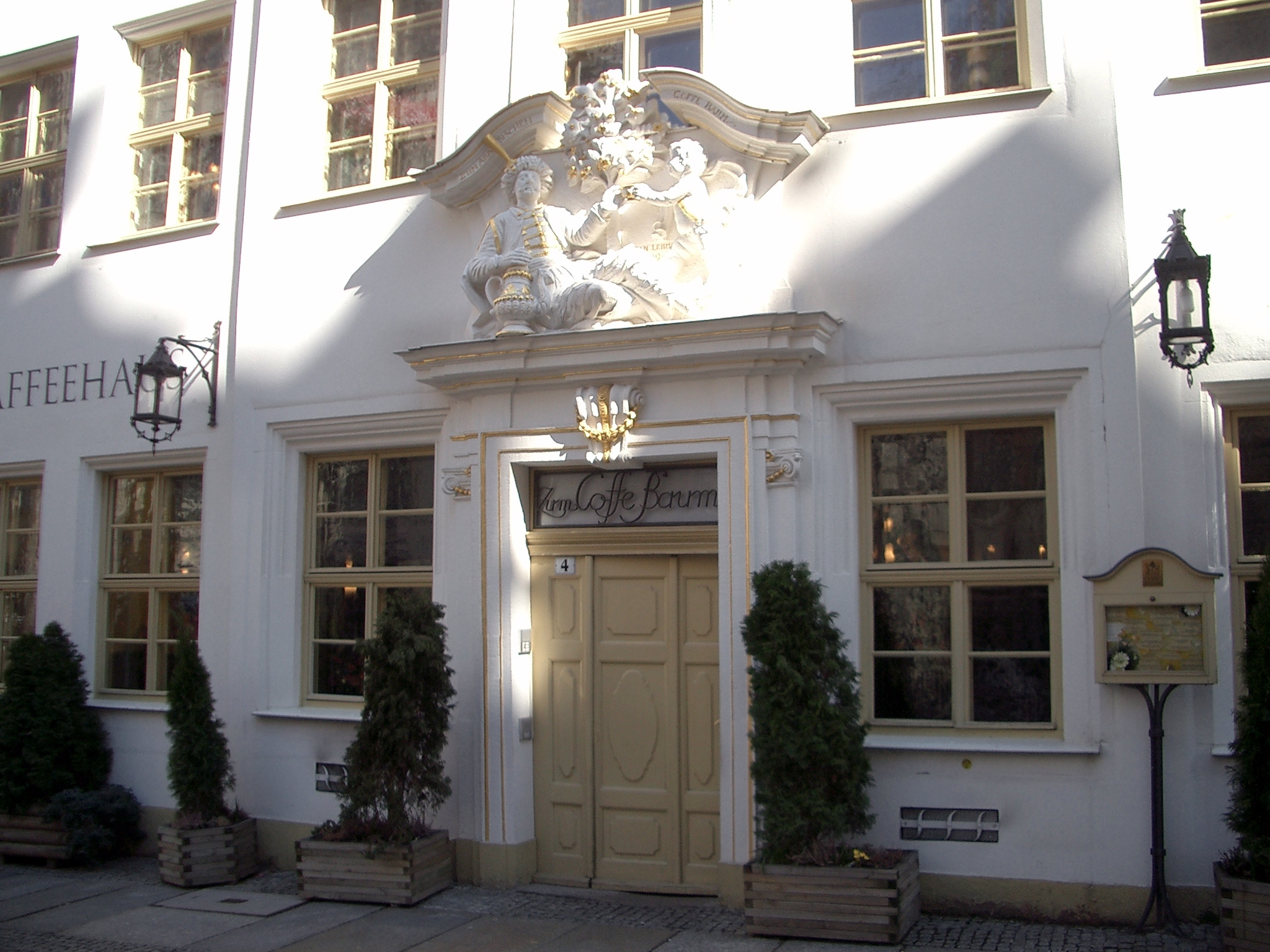
Museum zum Arabischen Coffe Baum

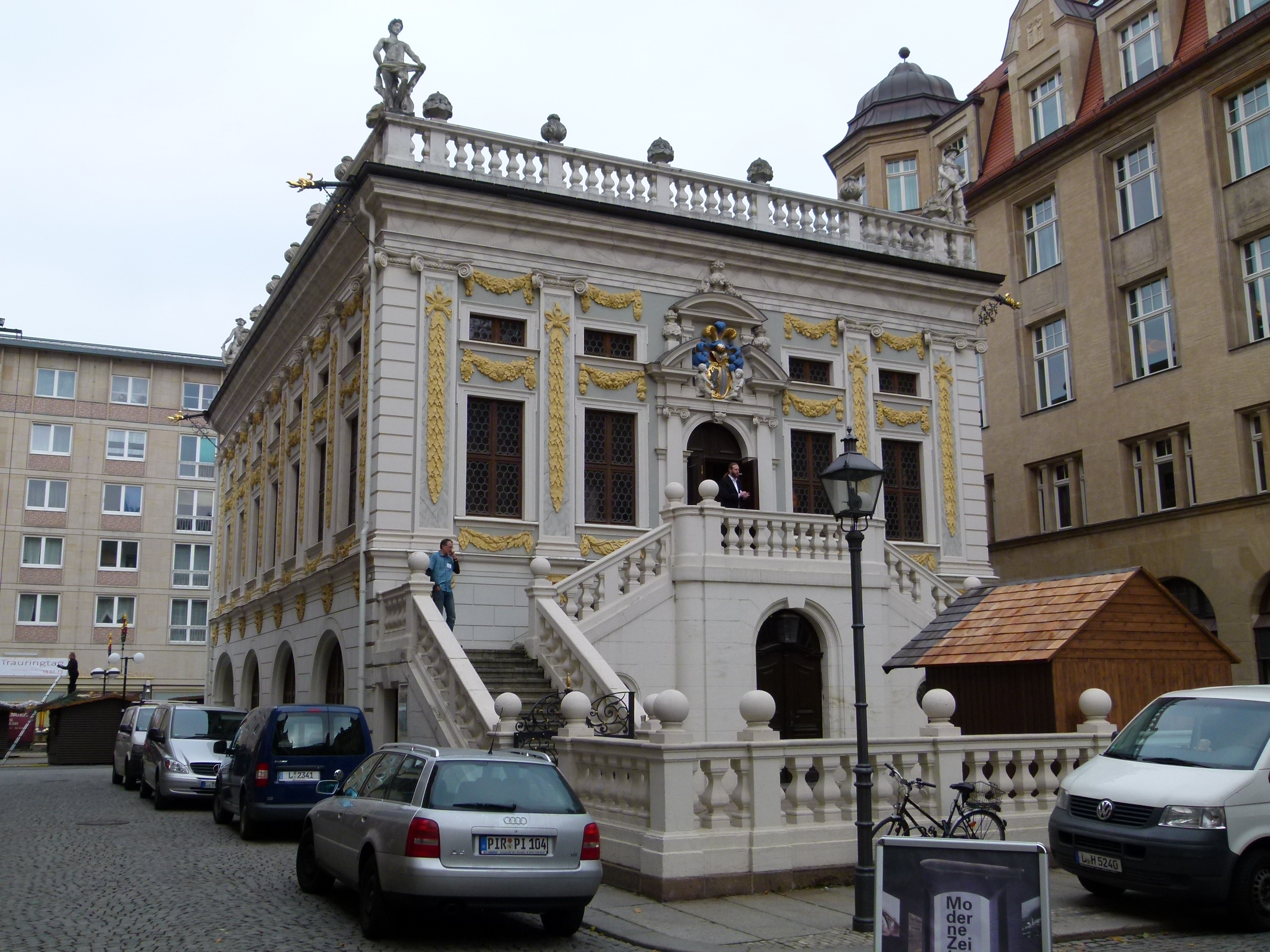
Alte Handelsbörse

== Facilities ==
=== Old Town Hall ===
(51.3418351°N 12.37638°E)

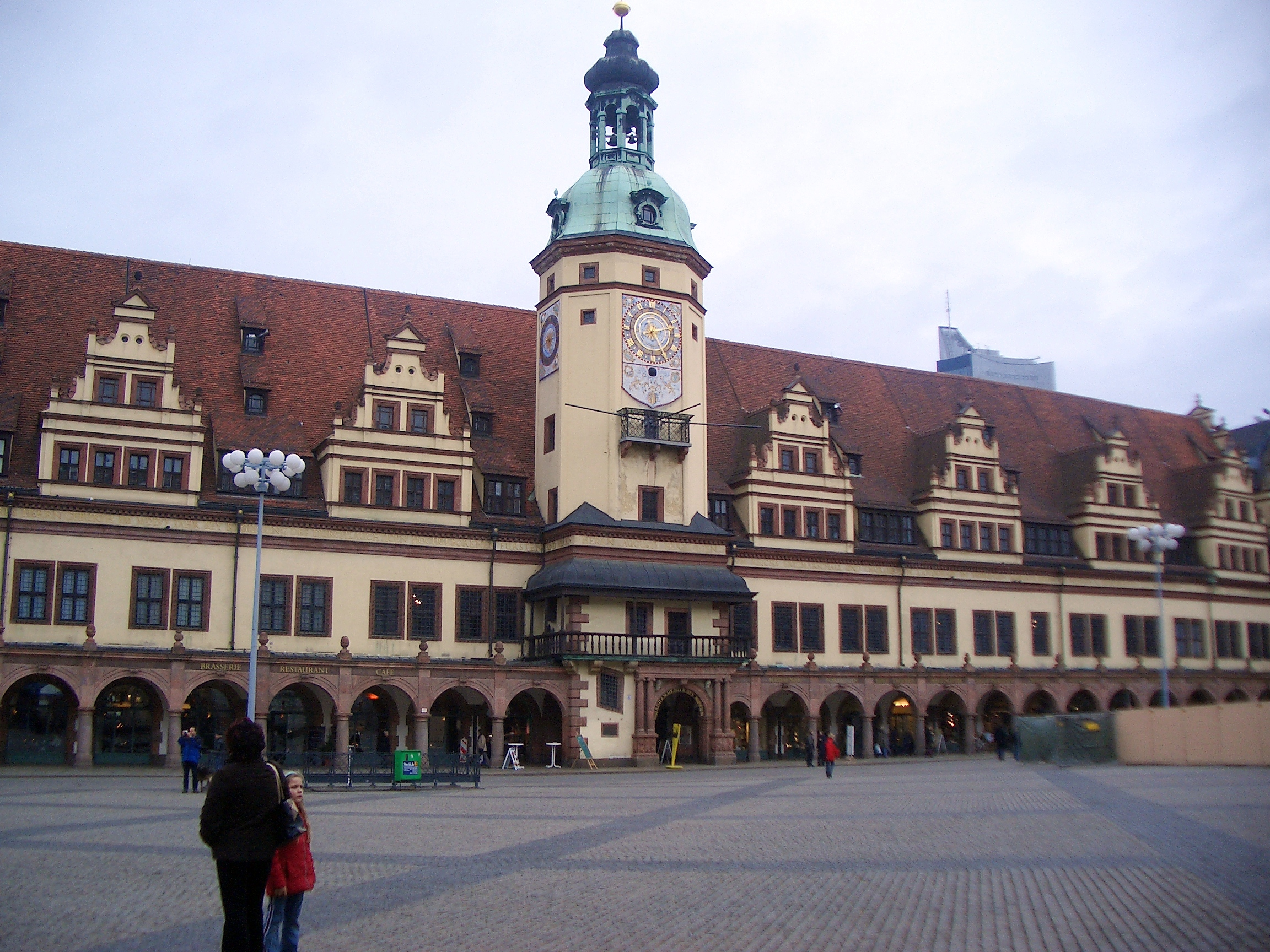
The Old Town Hall (front view)

The main location of the museum, in addition to the new building in Böttchergäßchen, is the Old Town Hall on the market square, with its central permanent exhibition on Leipzig's city history.

The main floor of the Old Town Hall houses a permanent exhibition on the history of Leipzig, from its founding as a city to the Battle of the Nations in 1813. The focal point of this area is the Renaissance ballroom, which is also used for receptions and cultural events. It features a 25 m^{2} (269.1 sq ft) city model, depicting Leipzig in 1823 in contemporary detail. In addition to two picture galleries (portraits of princes and city judges), Leipzig's jurisprudence is also on display, including a handwritten edition of the Sachsenspiegel from 1461 and numerous objects related to Johann Christian Woyzeck. Starting from the ballroom, visitors enter chronologically and thematically structured sections (early history and city development, Middle Ages, church and university, Reformation, trade fair, Baroque, architecture and gardens, everyday city life, cultural flourishing, war and peace, history of the Old Town Hall, crafts, music). The southern part of the main floor also houses the council chamber and the treasury with objects from the Leipzig Kramer treasure.

On the upper floor, with an area of approximately 1,500 m^{2} (16,145.9 sq ft), the second part of the permanent exhibition, entitled "Modern Times: Leipzig from Industrialization to the Present", opened on 11 December 2011. In addition to a detailed chronological presentation of the city's history from 1815 onward, Leipzig's significance in the areas of books, music, trade fairs, and sports is dealt with separately in the so-called "Themes of a City". In the attic of the Old Town Hall, there is a reenactment of Leipzig's destruction in World War II.

The rear of the building provides access to the former dungeons of the Old Town Hall, located in the basement.

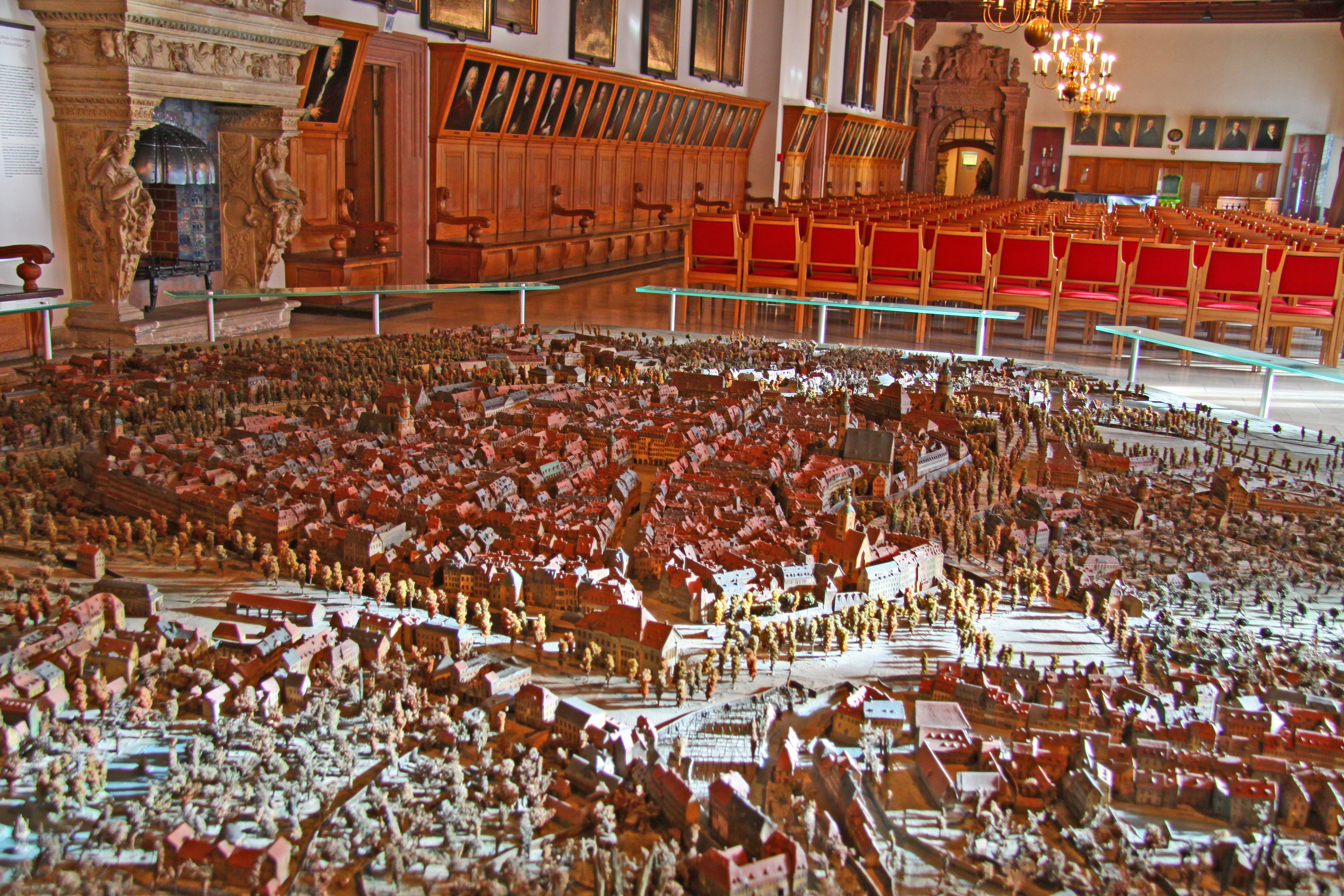
The city model of Leipzig in the festival hall

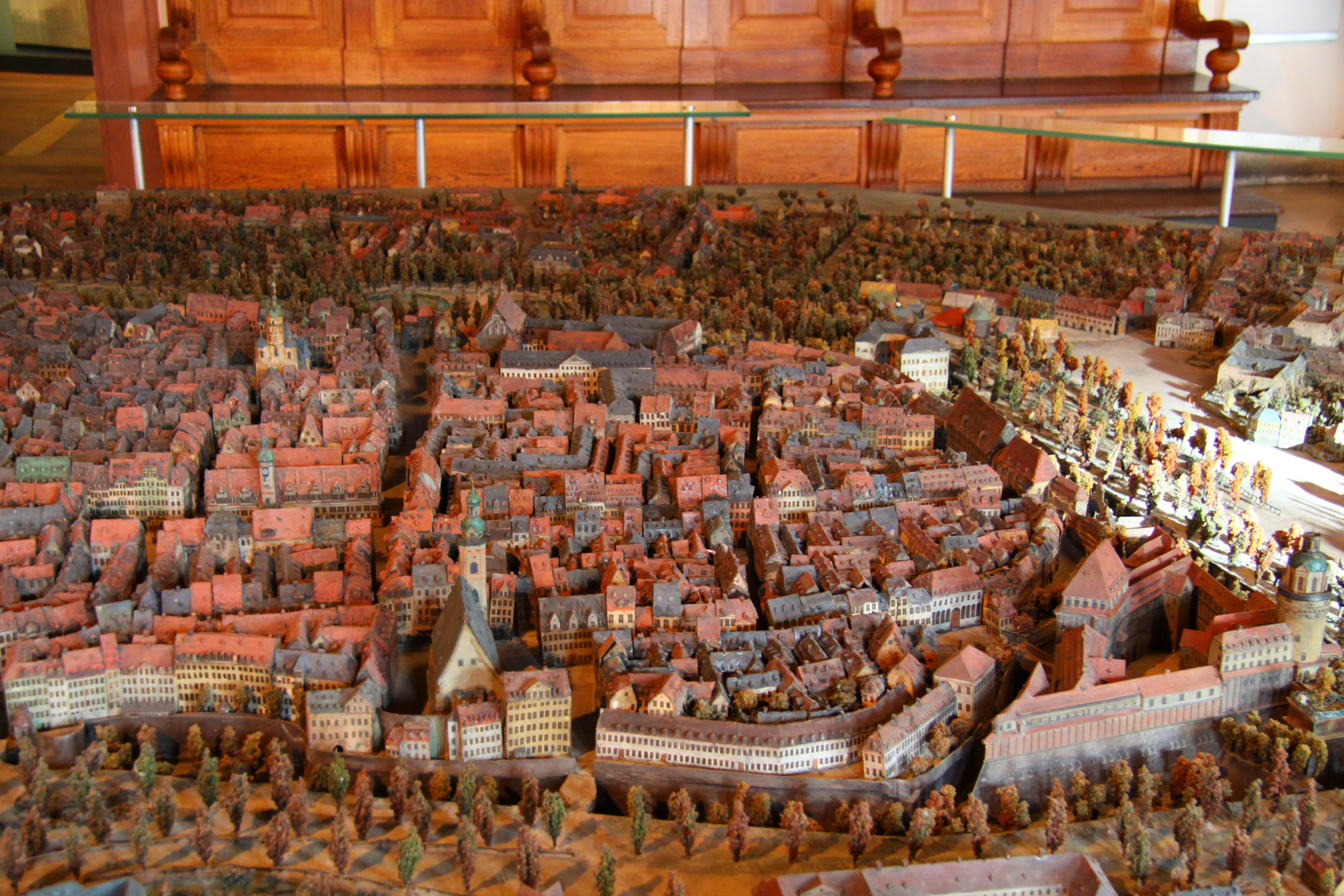
Detailed view of the city model

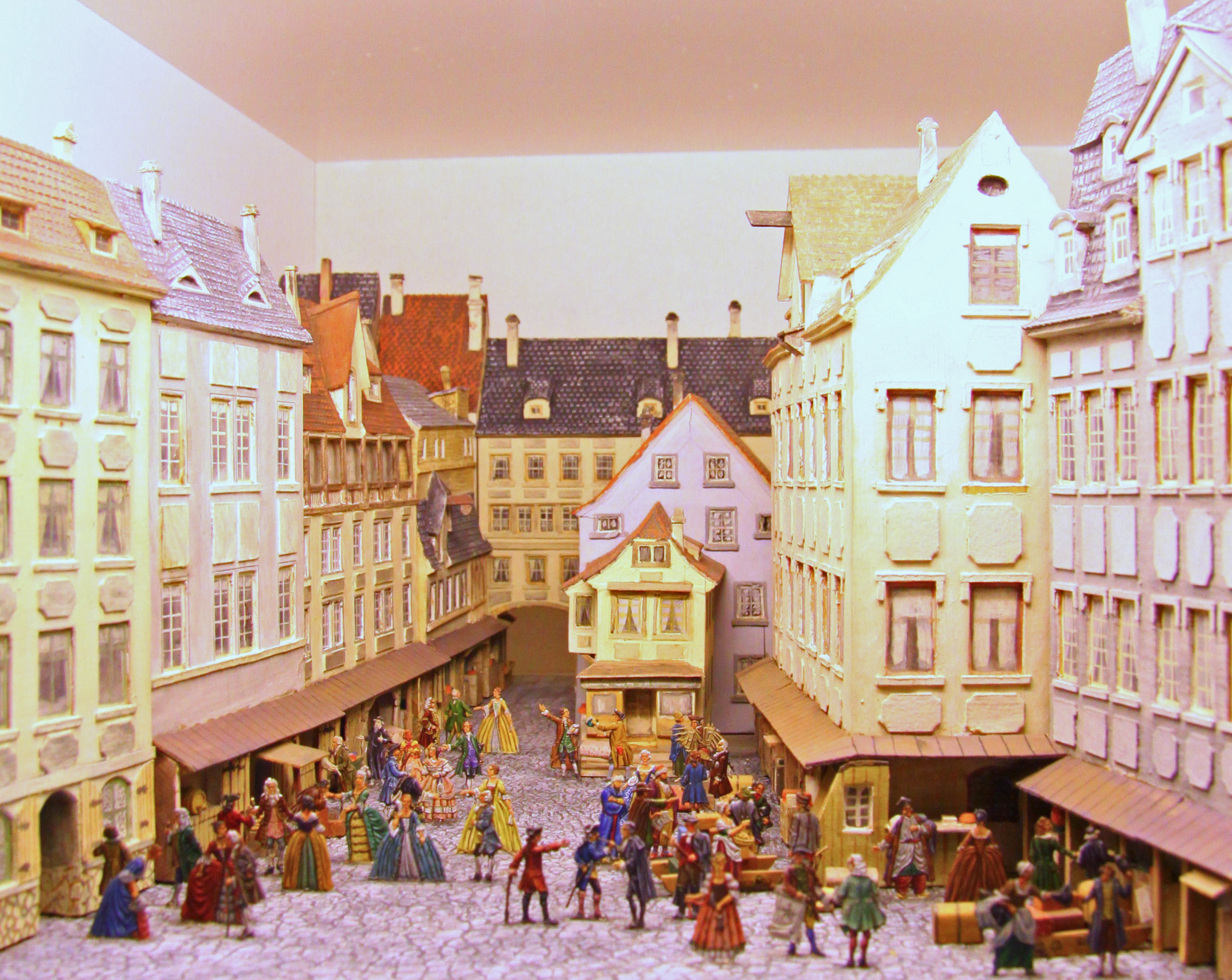
Model of Leipzig with tin figures

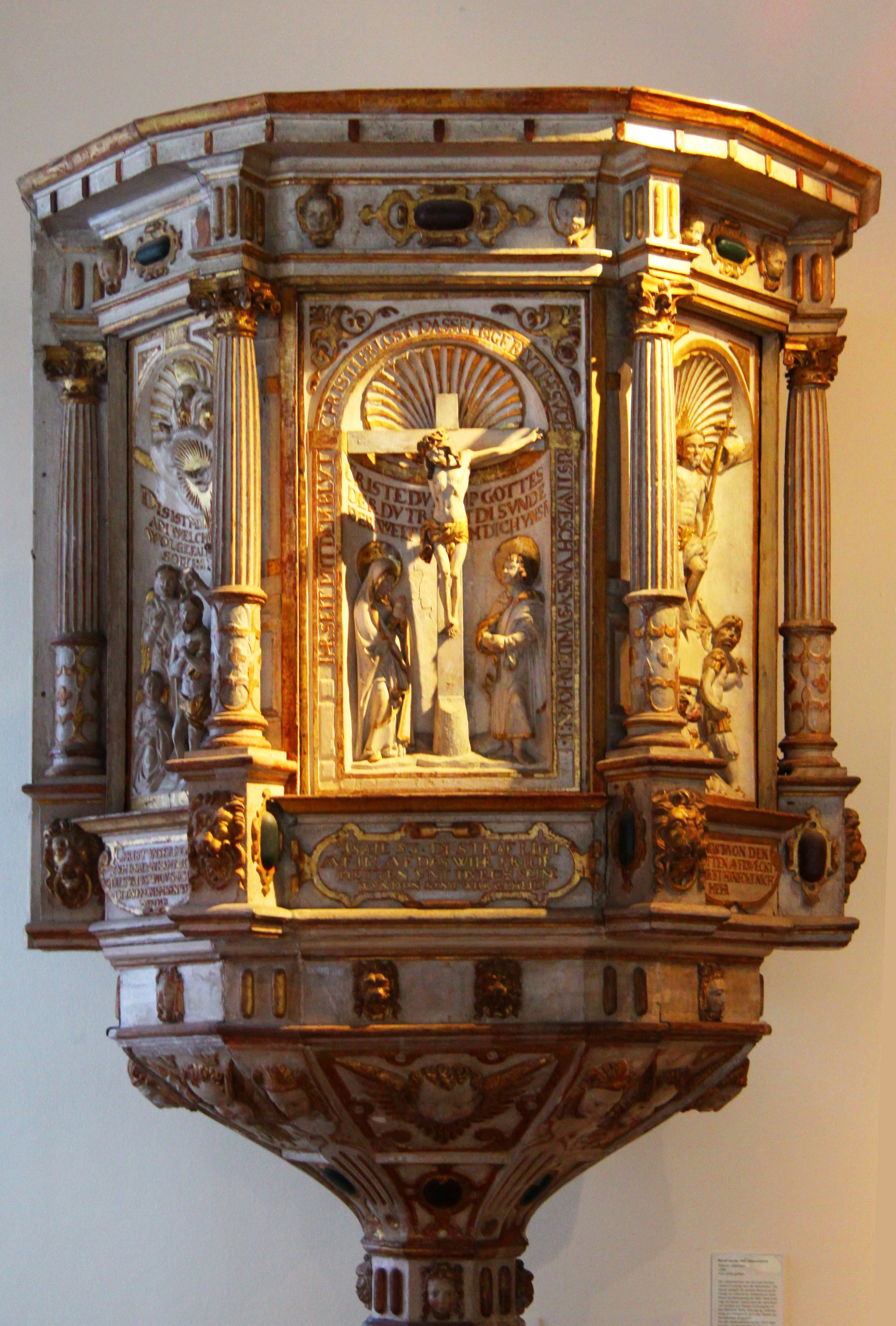
Pulpit of the destroyed St. John's Church (Johanniskirche)

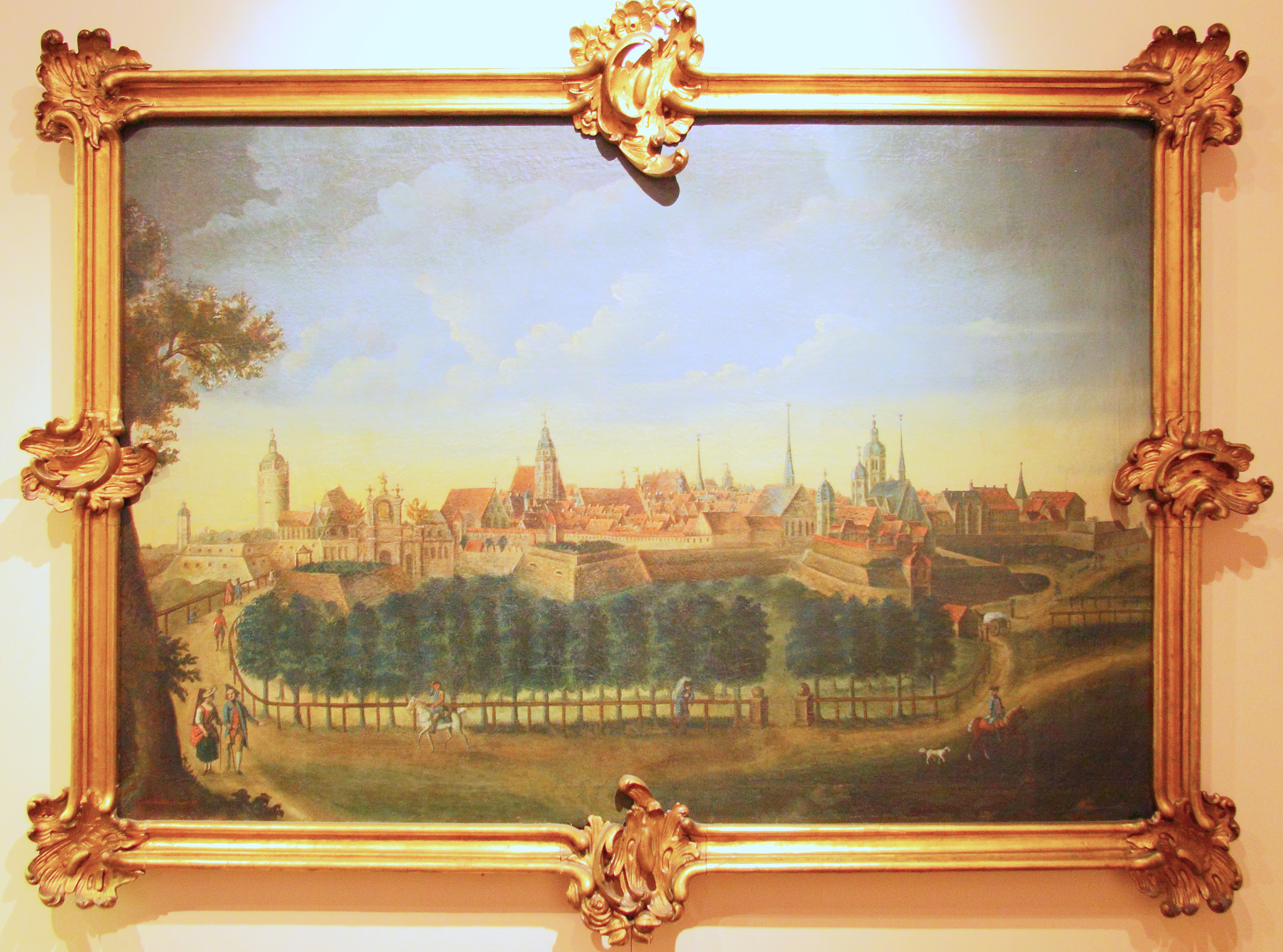
City view from the 18th century

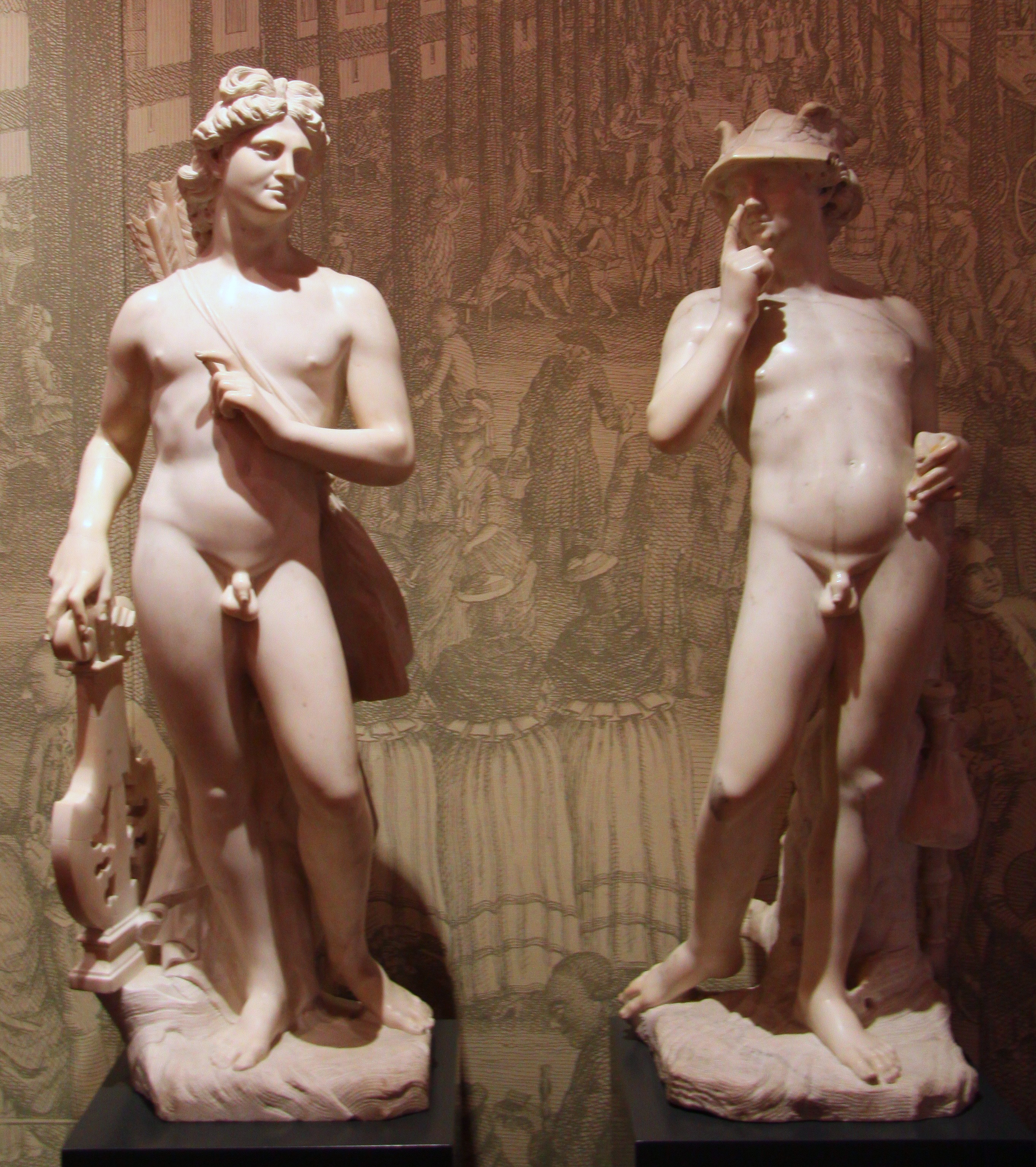
Statues of Apollo and Mercury

=== House Böttchergäßchen ===
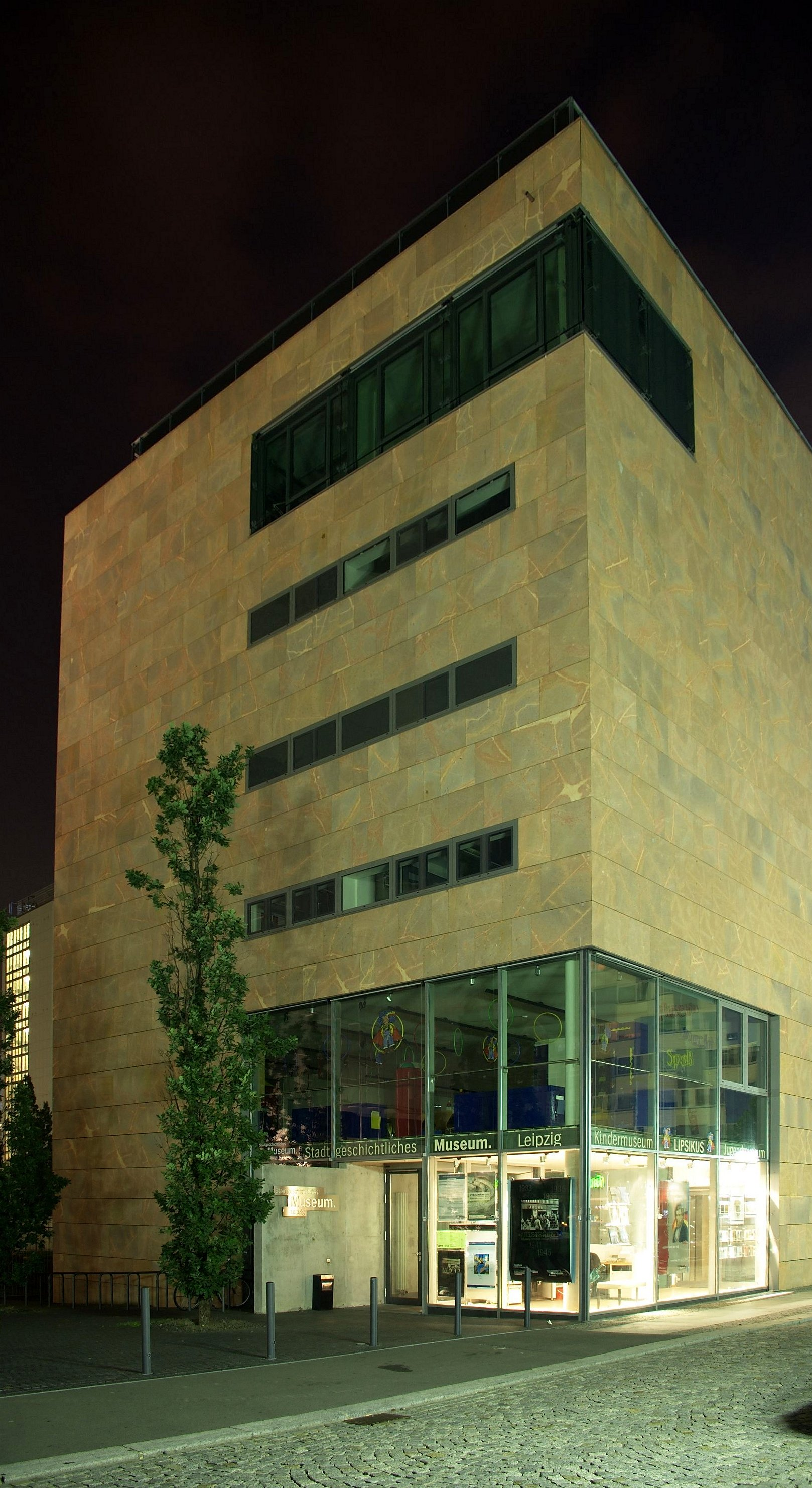
House Böttchergäßchen at night

The new building in Böttchergäßchen, opened in 2004, was designed by the architectural firms Coersmeier and Ilg, Friebe, Nauber. In addition to a foyer, studio, and visitor services, it contains a special exhibition area, a children's museum, a library, photo library, workshops, and the museum's documentation and administration. The central depot, spread over three floors (1,900 m^{2} (20,451.4 sq ft)), forms the core of the building. The five-story building's natural stone façade, made of red Rochlitz porphyry, is opened up at the top by a recessed glass storey. The official name "Neubau" (New Building) was replaced by the name "House Böttchergäßchen" at the end of 2014.

On 11 November 2024, the installation "Drops on Stars" by Leipzig artist Maix Mayer was inaugurated in the winding backyard of the building, in the so-called Museums-Karree. It consists of two street lamps (called "drop lamps"), which were manufactured during the GDR era by VEB Leuchtenbau Leipzig, and a star-shaped stainless steel sculpture below them in a red tartan circle.

==== Children's museum ====
The first children's and youth museum, "Lipsikus", opened with an exhibition on the mezzanine floor of the Böttchergäßchen building in November 2004. Until 2013, it formed the center of the museum's educational offerings in the new building of the City History Museum. In addition to permanent areas (e.g., presentations of the museum's individual facilities, a self-assembled three-dimensional city model, a freely accessible children's (puppet) theater, an automaton with stereoscopic views of old Leipzig, and presentations of private children's collections), small temporary exhibitions and events were regularly presented. After a temporary closure, the children's museum reopened at the end of 2015 with a new focus. Since then, an interactive, hands-on exhibition entitled "Children Make Trade Fairs" has presented Leipzig as a trade fair and trade city.

==== Library ====
The special academic library (reference collection) comprises approximately 140,000 volumes focusing on urban and regional history. In addition to the first documented book printed in Leipzig (Giovanni Nanni's Glosa Apocalipsim from 1481), the holdings include other incunables and early prints, municipal ordinances from the late 15th century onward, rare writings from the Reformation period, and numerous regionally significant historical chronicles. Special collections, which can be viewed in the library, include:

- Battle of Leipzig, Napoleon Bonaparte, Wars of Liberation.
- Richard Wagner (Rudolf Hagedorn Collection).
- History of the German and international workers' movement (Karl Wiegel Collection from the library of the former Georgi Dimitrov Museum in Leipzig).
- Leipziger Zeitung, Leipziger Illustrirte Zeitung (largely complete).
- various unique copies of Johann Jacob Vogel's extensive city chronicle, Leipzigisches Geschicht-Buch Oder Annales (1714 and 1756), bound with numerous copperplate engravings.
- the historical Chamber Library of the Leipzig Chamber of Commerce and Industry (on permanent loan).
- historical and rare children's and young adult books since the 18th century (Heiner Vogel Collection).
- Felix Mendelssohn Bartholdy (Rudolf Elvers Collection).
- Showmen's and other posters of the 18th and 19th centuries.

=== Photo library ===
The photo library, with its approximately 105,000 objects, represents one of the largest collection fields of the City History Museum. These include:

- Legacy of Bertha Wehnert-Beckmann (83 daguerreotypes, 3,500 glass negatives, paper prints).
- Hermann Walter legacy (4,000 glass negatives and vintage prints on Leipzig's urban and architectural history from 1870 to 1909).
- Over 500 photographic plates and prints by Hermann Vogel (Leipzig monuments and cityscapes around 1900).
- Johannes Widmann's legacy (1877 negatives, focus on destruction and reconstruction of Leipzig around 1945).
- Collection on the popular uprising on 17 June 1953 in Leipzig.
- Collection of the former museum on the history of the workers' movement.
- Photographs of the events of the Leipzig Autumn 1989 (Peaceful Revolution).

=== Monument to the Battle of the Nations / FORUM 1813 ===
(51.3125°N 12.4136°E)

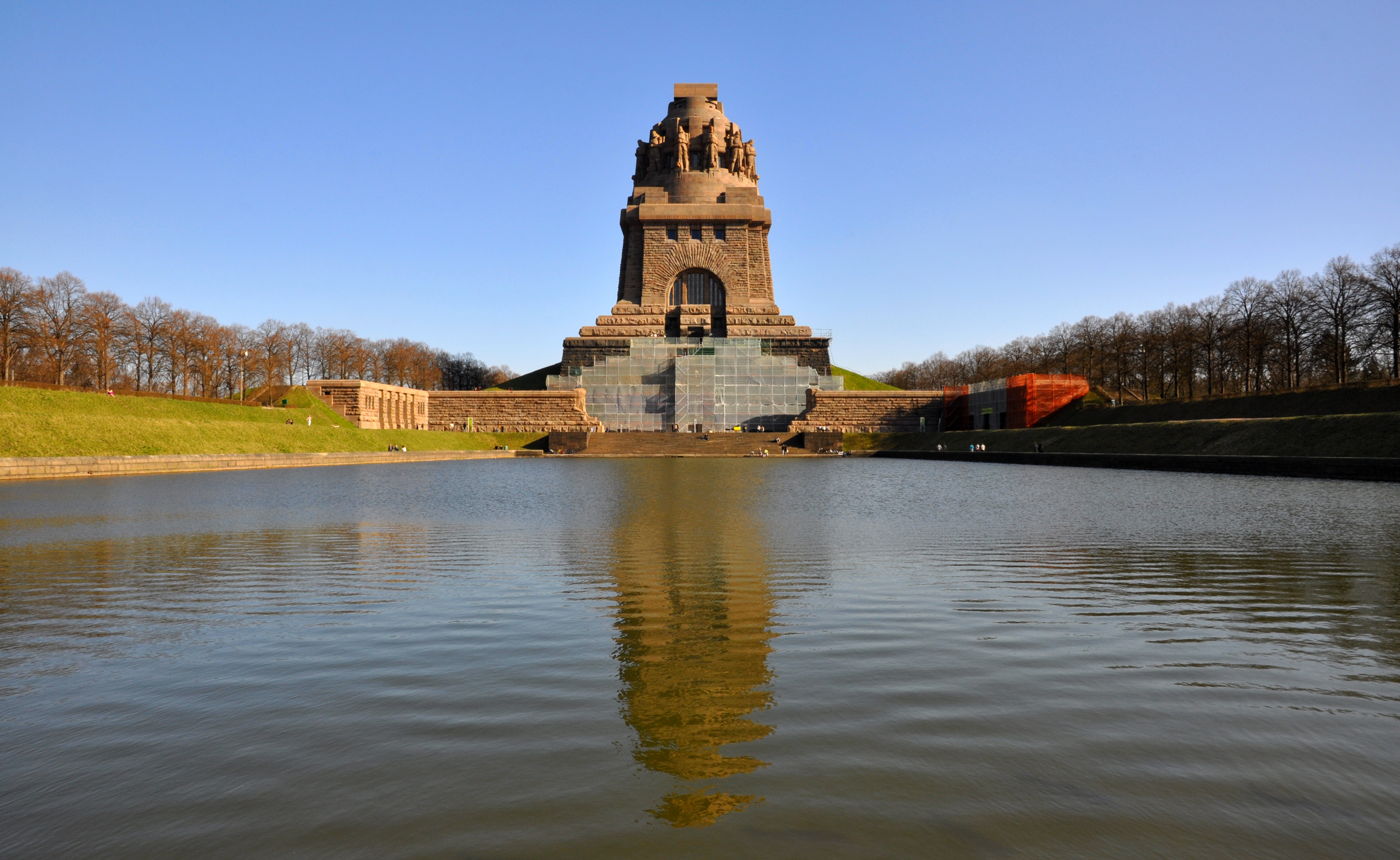
Monument to the Battle of the Nations

There are three observation decks at the Monument to the Battle of the Nations. The first one is located below the actual entrance to the monument. The middle one, at a height of 57 metres (187.0 feet), is also accessible via elevators, and the top of the 91 m (298.6 ft) tall structure can be reached via a total of 500 steps.

In the crypt of the memorial, a bronze gravestone, usually adorned with a wreath, commemorates the victims of the Battle of the Nations. Cultural events, primarily concerts, are also regularly held here. In the Hall of Fame, located one level higher, with its four approximately 9.5 m (31.2 ft) tall statues of the watchmen of the dead, an exhibition explores the construction history of the Battle of the Nations Memorial.

The FORUM 1813 exhibition hall, opened in 1999 in the monument's former construction workshop, is located in the right-hand annex to the Battle of the Nations Monument and covers the history of the Battle of the Nations. It focuses on the lives of people from the French Revolution to the end of the Wars of Liberation. The exhibition explores, among other things, the impact of the French Revolution in Saxony, the effects of the alliance with Napoleon Bonaparte on everyday life in Leipzig, and the city's lifeline, the trade fair. A diorama recreates the battlefield at a scale of 1:72. An incendiary rocket with a ladder-like launching frame has been reconstructed, which English units fired at Paunsdorf on 18 October 1813, setting the village on fire.

Opposite the FORUM 1813 on the left side in front of the Völkerschlachtdenkmal (Battle of the Nations Monument) is the service and visitor center of the building complex.

=== Schiller House ===
(51.3588°N 12.3628°E)

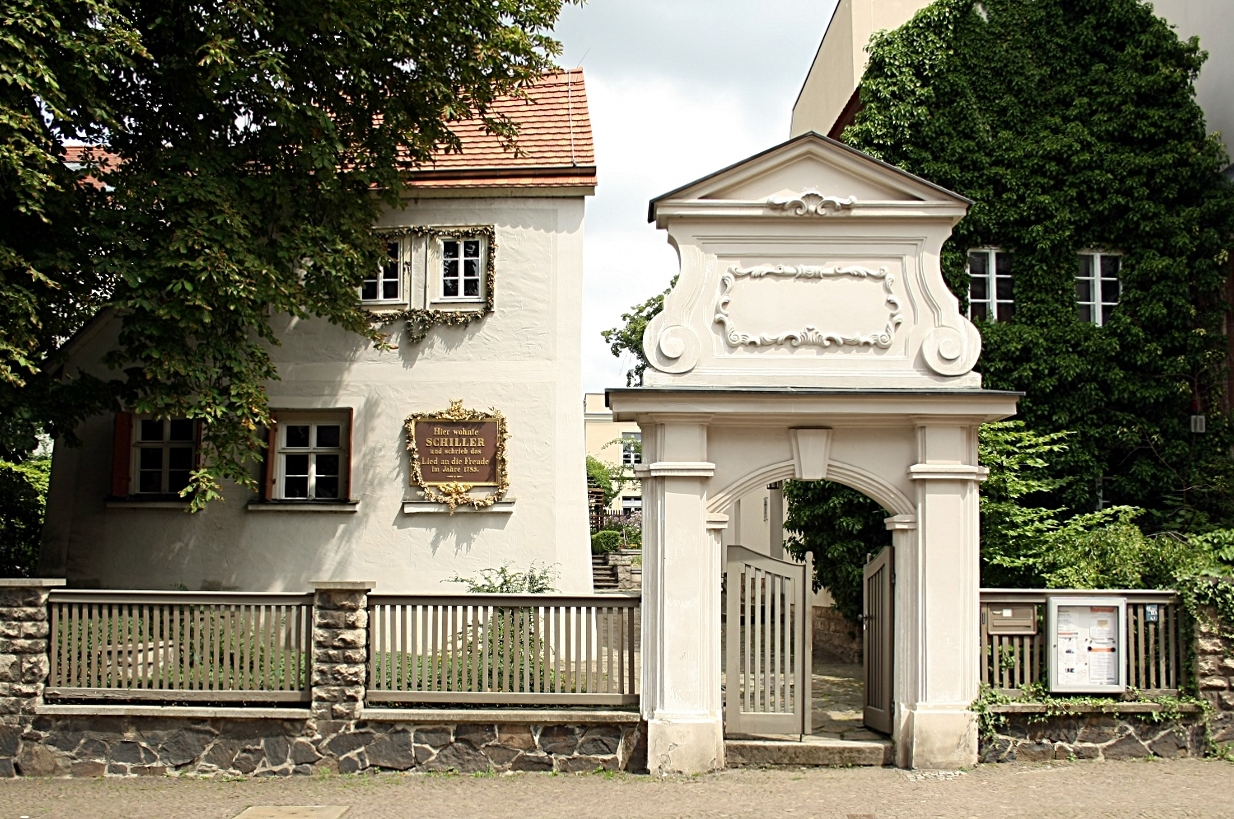
Schiller House

Built in 1717, the oldest surviving farmhouse in Leipzig was reopened in 1998 after extensive restoration and repairs. The rural, farm-like rooms, consisting of the Göschenzimmer (Göschen Room), Bauernstube (farmer's parlor), Schillerstube (Schiller's Room), bedroom, and kitchen, house individual smaller exhibition areas on the following topics:

- Friedrich Schiller and Leipzig.
- Robert Blum
- Leipzig and Gohlis around 1785 (with a model of the village of Gohlis).
- History of the Schiller House.
- the Leipzig Schiller Society.

Opposite the Schiller House, on the original Dreiseithof, is the Castellan's House, formerly used as a granary and stable, now housing the museum shop and administrative facilities. At the rear of the site, a farmer's garden, designed according to historical models, is located. Readings and theater performances take place on the grounds of the Schiller House throughout the year.

In April 2023, after several months of closure, the Schiller House reopened with a revised permanent exhibition called Götterfunke.

=== Alte Handelsbörse ===
(51.340633°N 12.375728°E)

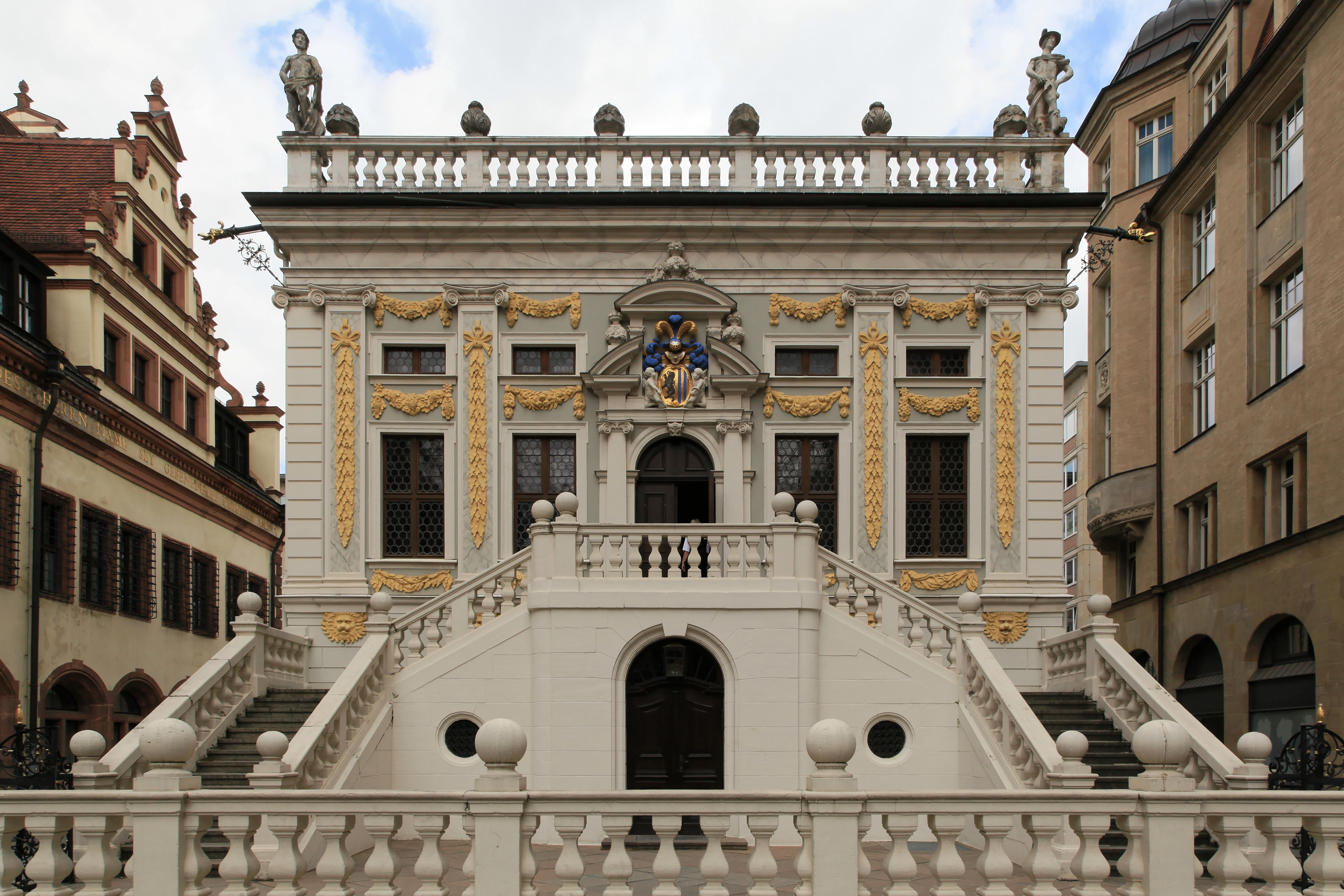
Alte Handelsbörse

The house, completed in 1687 for meetings of the Leipzig merchants (presumed architect: Johann Georg Starcke), is considered one of the oldest Baroque buildings in the city and is used for various cultural events.

=== Arabian Coffee Tree Museum ===
(51.341081°N 12.372935°E)

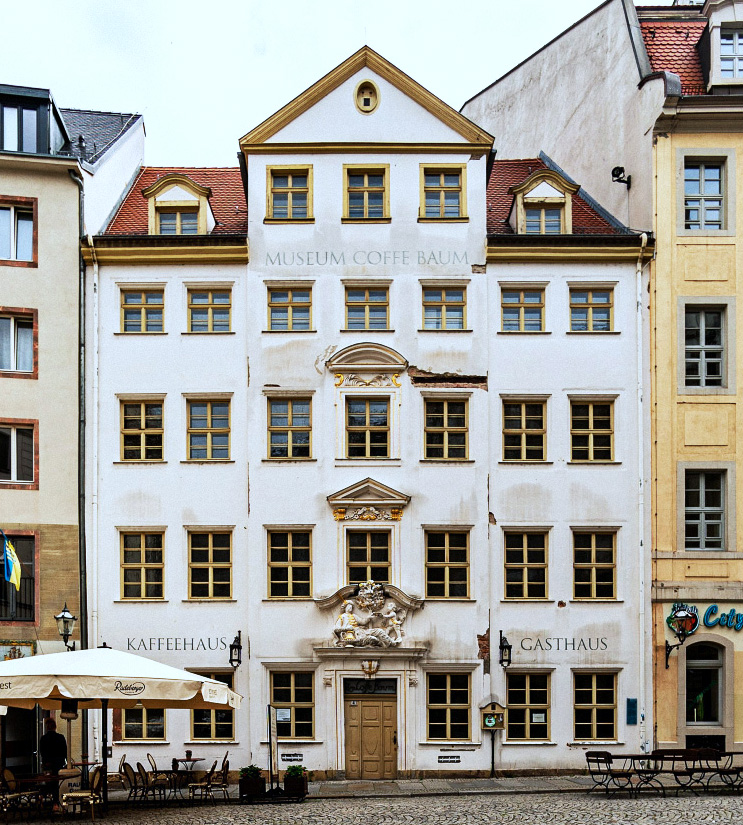
Arabian Coffeehouse and Museum

Opened in 1999, the free museum presents the cultural history of coffee, with a focus on Saxony, in 16 rooms on the second and third floors of the building, first mentioned in 1556. Coffee has been served here since 1711, making it one of the oldest coffee houses in Europe. The German name is Zum Arabischen Coffe Baum. The museum was closed for renovations in 2019, but reopened with a revised design on 1 July 2025.

=== Sports museum ===
(51.3516°N 12.3464°E)

The exhibition area of the sports museum, which opened in 1977 in the façade extension of the Central Stadium, has been closed since 1991, but continues to operate as a collection and documentation center with archive and library (current address: Sportforum 10).

=== Capa House ===
(51.33823°N 12.34206°E)

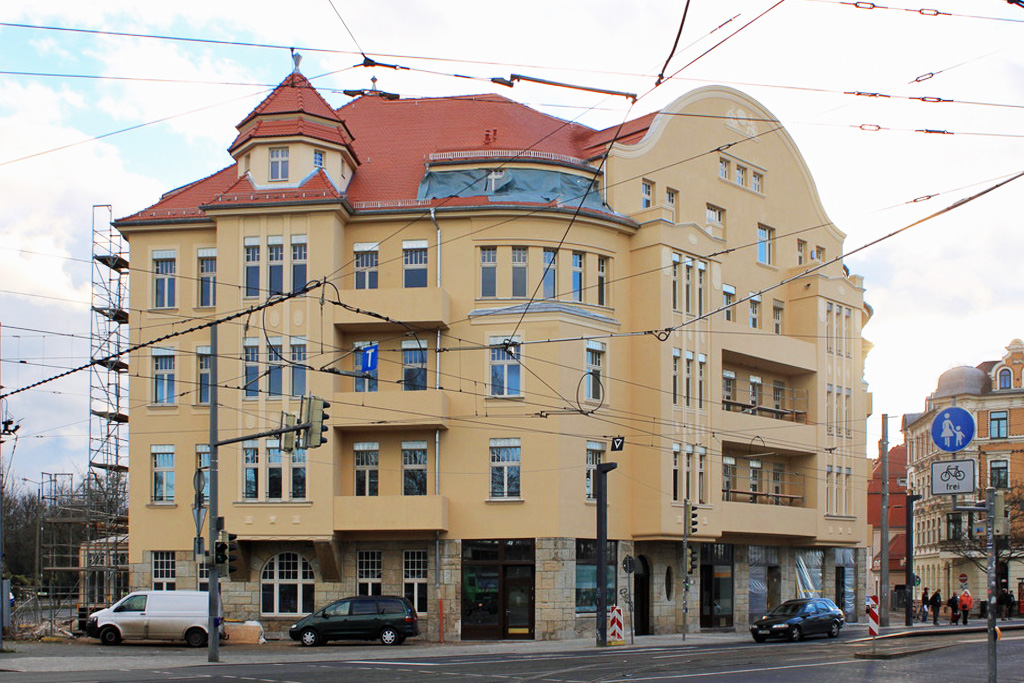
Capa House

The Capa House, named after the US war reporter and photographer Robert Capa, is used as an exhibition, event and meeting place, with the City History Museum curating the permanent exhibition War is Over.

== Directors ==
- 1909–1917: Albrecht Kurzwelly
- 1918–1945: Friedrich Schulze
- 1945–1946: Walter Lange
- 1946–1948: Felix Günther
- 1949–1971: Heinz Füßler
- 1971–1979: Lothar Wenzel
- 1979–1996: Klaus Sohl
- 1996–2019: Volker Rodekamp
- since 1. April 2019: Anselm Hartinger
