= Richard Graul =

German art historian and museum curator

Richard Graul (24 June 1862 – 25 December 1944) was a German art historian and museum curator.

== Life ==
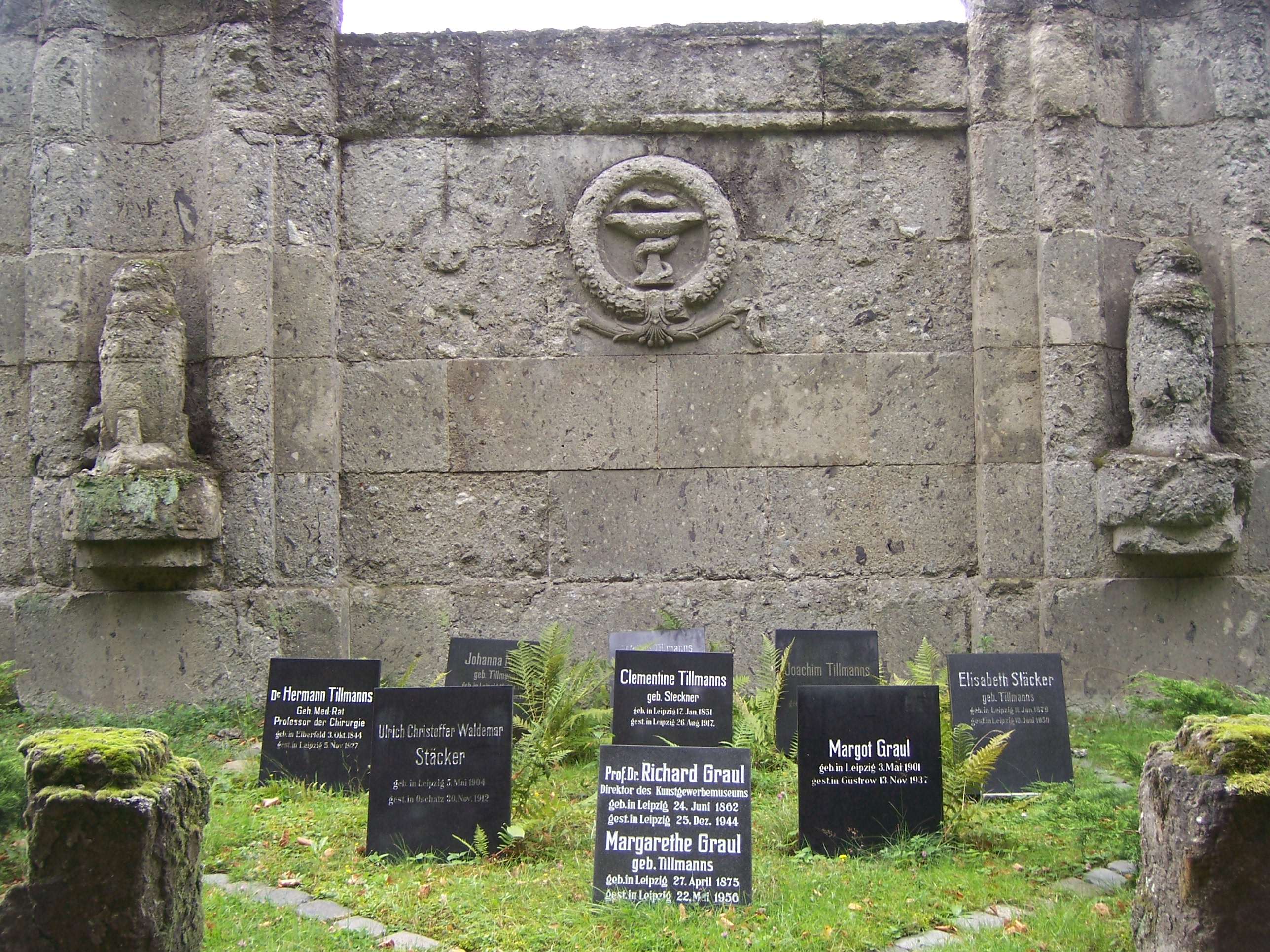
Tomb of Richard Graul at the Südfriedhof in Leipzig

Born in Leipzig, the son of a wallpaper pattern artist and manufacturer, completed an apprenticeship as a bookseller in Frankfurt. In 1881 he joined his father's pattern-drawing studio in Frankfurt, where he first became involved with industrial arts. In 1888 he received his doctorate in Zürich with a dissertation on the history of decorative sculpture in the Netherlands during the 16th century. From 1889 to 1892 he was secretary of the Society for Reproducing Art in Vienna and, in addition, editor of its journal Die graphischen Künste until 1894. In 1892 he began as a trainee in the sculpture collection and the picture gallery of the Staatliche Museen zu Berlin, where he became assistant at the Alte Nationalgalerie in 1894 and worked in 1896 at the Kunstgewerbemuseum Berlin with Julius Lessing.

In 1896 Graul left Berlin and went to the Leipzig Museum of Applied Arts of which he was director from 1896 to 1929. From 1924 he was also director of the Museum der bildenden Künste in Leipzig. Graul developed the Leipzig Museum of Applied Arts into a museum of European standing, and his many activities had a lasting effect on the museum.

In 1920 he founded the Grassimesse, a sales fair independent of the Leipzig Trade Fair. It took place in the rooms of the museum at the same time as the spring and autumn fairs. Graul initiated the construction of the new Grassimuseum, which took place from 1925 to 1929. Already from 1926 the house could be occupied depending on the progress of the construction. Thus the Grassimesse 1926 took place in the wing on Hospitalstraße (today Prager Straße). Under Graul's management it developed into an arts and crafts fair with high quality standards. He attracted international attention with the large special exhibition "European Arts and Crafts 1927" in the new museum building. It made the Grassimuseum known throughout Europe.

Graul was founder of the magazine The Museum (1886) and co-founder and temporary editor of the art magazine Pan (1894–1896). He was editor in 1898/1899 and from 1925 to 1931 publisher of the Zeitschrift für bildende Kunst.

Graul was a member of several museum committees, including the Kunstgeschichtliche Gesellschaft Berlin, the Deutscher Werkbund and the Saxon Landesstelle für Kunstgewerbe in Dresden. He was also the founder and long-standing chairman of the Society of Friends of the Museum of Decorative Arts Leipzig.

== Publications ==
- Einführung in die Kunstgeschichte. Leipzig: Kröner, 1887 (8th edition in 1923)
- Ostasiatische Kunst und ihr Einfluss aus Europa Leipzig: B.G. Teubner, 1906
- Bilderatlas zur Einführung in die Kunstgeschichte., Leipzig: Seemann, 1907 (6th edition)
- Denkschrift über die Entwicklung des Kunstgewerbe-Museums und die Notwendigkeit eines Museumsneubaus. Leipzig: Hedrich, 1910
- Alt-Flandern. Brabant/Artois/Hennegau/Lüttich/Namur. Bilderband mit 200 photographischen Aufnahmen (...), München-Pasing: Roland-Verlag Dr. Albert Mundt, 1918, 46 p. text + 88 p. photos.

== Literature ==
- Mitteilungen des städtischen Museums für Kunsthandwerk / Grassimuseum und seines Freundes- und Förderkreises e.–V.. issue 2, 1993, Eisel 2001.
- Walther Killy, Rudolf Vierhaus: Deutsche Biographische Enzyklopädie. Volume 4: Gies–Hessel. Saur, Munich 1996, ISBN 3-598-23164-4.
- Richard Graul zum 80. Geburtstage. Verzeichnis seiner Schriften. Ihrem hochverdientem Gründer und langjährigen Vorsitzenden in Dankbarkeit gewidmet von der Gesellschaft der Freunde des Kunstgewerbe-Museums zu Leipzig am 24. Juni 1942. Städtisches Kunstgewerbe-Museum, Leipzig 1942.
