= Freistudentenschaft =

Historical students' association

The Freistudentschaft was a German student body established in Wilhelmine Germany in 1900. It brought together students on a liberal basis, rejecting the uniforms other aspects of the German Student Corps. Students outside these Corps were called the "Nicht-Inkorporierten" (not-incorporated). However a dilemma soon arose as to whether the organisation should be non-political and embrace all the Nicht-Inkorporierten, or adopt an ideology to advance specific reforms.

Felix W. Behrend wrote the first programme.
