= Moriz Carrière =

German philosopher and historian

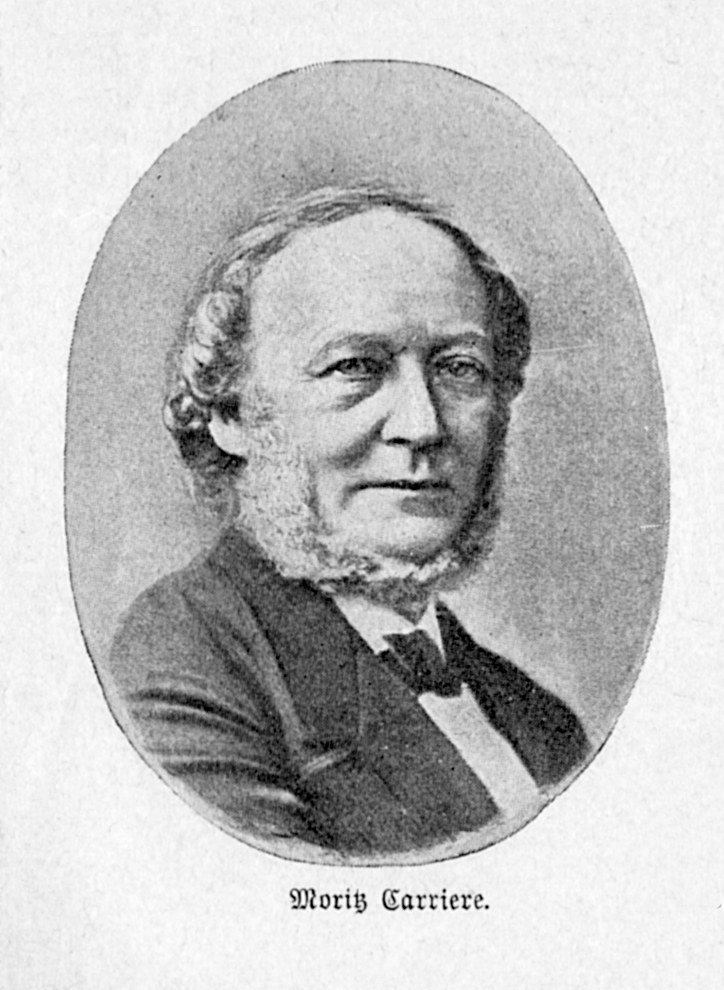
Moriz Carrière 1896

Moriz Carrière (5 March 1817, Griedel near Darmstadt, Germany – 19 January 1895, Munich) was a German philosopher and historian.

Carrière was born in Griedel near Darmstadt, Germany. After studying at the University of Giessen, the University of Göttingen, and the Friedrich Wilhelm University of Berlin, he spent a few years in Italy studying the fine arts, and established himself in 1842 at Giessen as a teacher of philosophy. In 1853, he was appointed professor at the Ludwig-Maximilians-Universität München, where he lectured mainly on aesthetics. In the academy in Munich, he lectured on art history.

Carrière contributed in no small degree to making the idea of German unity more palatable to the South Germans. Carrière identified himself with the school of the younger Fichte as one who held the theistic view of the world which aimed at reconciling deism with pantheism, and Christianity with science, art, and history, and who were opposed to ultramontanism. He urged the conversion of the cathedral of Cologne into a free church. Although no obstinate adherent of antiquated forms and prejudices, he firmly upheld the fundamental truths of Christianity.

Carrière died in Munich on 19 January 1895.

== Works ==
- Aesthetik (Leipzig, 1859; 3rd ed., 1885), supplemented by Die Kunst im Zusammenhang der Kulturentwicklung und der Ideale der Menschheit (3rd ed., 1877-1886) This is cited by some as his most celebrated work.
- Die philosophische Weltanschauung der Reformalionszeit (Stuttgart, 1847; 2nd ed., Leipzig, 1886)
- Die sittliche Weltordnung (Leipzig, 1877; 2nd ed., 1891) Here he recognized both the immutability of the laws of nature and the freedom of the will. He described his view of the world and life as real-idealism.

He translated the letters of Abélard and Héloise into German, and composed a poem on the last night of the Girondists. His essay on Cromwell (in Lebensskizzen, 1890) develops his liberal ideas and may be considered his political confession of faith. He has prepared annotated editions of Goethe's Faust and Schiller's Wilhelm Tell. During the Franco-Prussian War, he delivered lectures on Die sittliche Weltordnung in den Zeichen und Aufgaben unserer Zeit (Munich, 1870), and on Deutsche Geisteshelden im Elsass (1871). His complete works were published at Leipzig, 14 vols., in 1886–1894.
