= Friedrich Schulz (disambiguation) =

Friedrich Schulz (1897–1976) was a German general.

Friedrich Schulz, Friedrich Schultz, Friedrich Schulze, or Friedrich Schultze may also refer to:

- Friedrich August Schulze (1770–1849), German novelist
- Friedrich Wilhelm Schulz (1797–1860), German radical-democratic publisher
- Friedrich Eduard Schulz (1799–1829), German orientalist and philosopher
- Friedrich Wilhelm Schultz (1804–1876), German pharmacist and botanist
- Friedrich Schultze (1848–1934), German neurologist

== See also ==
- Friedrich Schulze (disambiguation)
