= Friedrich Eduard König =

German Lutheran divine and Semitic scholar

Friedrich Eduard König (November 15, 1846 – February 10, 1936, Bonn) was a German Lutheran divine and Semitic scholar.

== Biography ==
He was born at Reichenbach im Vogtland and was educated at the University of Leipzig (1867–71). Afterwards, he worked as a religious instructor at the Royal Realgymnasium in Döbeln (1871–76) and at the Thomasschule zu Leipzig (1876–79). He then became a lecturer (1879) and an associate professor of theology (1885) at the University of Leipzig. In 1888 he became a full professor at Rostock and in 1900 at the University of Bonn, where, as a theologian attacking Panbabylonism, he became involved in the so-called "Babel-Bible Dispute".

== Published works ==
As a linguist he attempted to apply the phonetic and physiological methods of modern philology to Hebrew and Ethiopic in such works as

- Gedanke, Laut und Accent als die drei Factoren der Sprachbildung (1874) – Thought, sound, and accent: as the three factors of language formation comparatively and physiologically represented in Hebrew.
- Neue Studien über Schrift: Aussprache und allgemeine Formenlehre des Aethiopischen (1877) – New studies on Scripture: pronunciation and general morphology of Ethiopian.
- Historisch-kritisches Lehrgebäude der Hebräischen Sprache, 3 books, (1881–97) – Historical-critical teaching of the Hebrew language.

Among his innumerable publications are also:

- The Religious History of Israel (1885); translation of Die Hauptprobleme der Altisraelitischen Religionsgeschichte (1884).
- Einleitung in das Alte Testament (1893).
- The exiles' book of consolation contained in Isaiah XL-LXVI : a critical and exegetical study; translated from the German by J.A. Selbie (1899).
- The Emphatic State in Aramaic (1901) In: The American Journal of Semitic Language Vol. 17, No. 4, Jul., 1901.
- Neueste Prinzipien der alttestamentlichen Kritik (1902).
- Bible and Babylon : Their Relationship in the History of Culture, translated by William Turnbull (1903). Pilter Kessinger Publishing Company 2006, ISBN 978-1-4254-8608-2; translation of Bibel und Babel : eine kulturgeschichtliche Skizze (1902).
- Die Gottesfrage und der Ursprung des Alten Testaments (1903).
- Ahasver der ewige Jude nach seiner ursprünglichen Idee und seiner literarischen Verwertung betrachtet (1907).
- Geschichte des Reiches Gottes bis auf Jesus Christus (1908).
- Hebräisches und aramäisches Wörterbuch zum Alten Testament (1910)
- Geschichte der alttestamentlichen Religion, kritisch dargestellt (1912).
