= Dreiseithof =

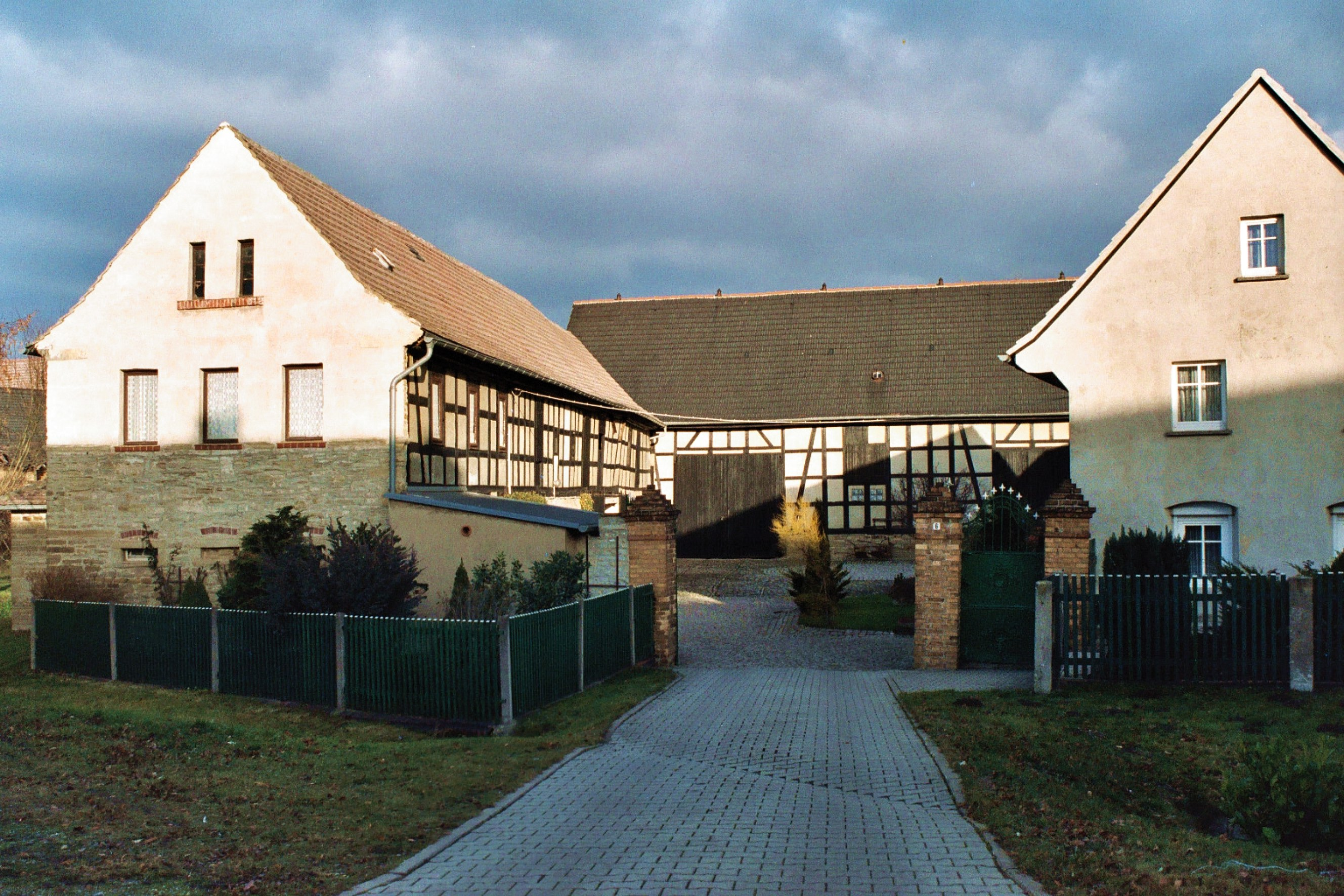
Loitzschütz (Gutenborn, Saxony-Anhalt)

Dreiseithof (three-sided farm) is a type of farmstead where the buildings are arranged on three sides of a mostly rectangular agricultural courtyard. The arrangement can vary significantly depending on the region.

== Schleswig-Holstein ==
In Angeln, the peninsula between the Schlei and Flensburger Förde in northeastern Schleswig-Holstein, such a farmstead is typically spacious and consists of three freestanding buildings. The residential house forms the rear of the courtyard and often resembles a manor house. The agricultural buildings are located to the right and left. In the center, there is often a courtyard linden tree. Next to the exit, there is often a duck pond, which also serves as a reservoir for firefighting water.

== Central and Southern Germany ==
In the central and southern parts of the German-speaking region, three-sided farms are often closely arranged. A large percentage of these farms are located in densely built-up closed villages. The buildings of the farmstead adjoin each other at the corners of the paved courtyard. The residential house is located on one side next to the entrance. The "Gute Stube" (good parlor) on the gable end has its windows facing the street. The rear of the courtyard is mostly occupied by the barn. Opposite the residential house, there is usually the stable or an additional house.
