= German Book Trades House =

Historic structure in Leipzig, Germany

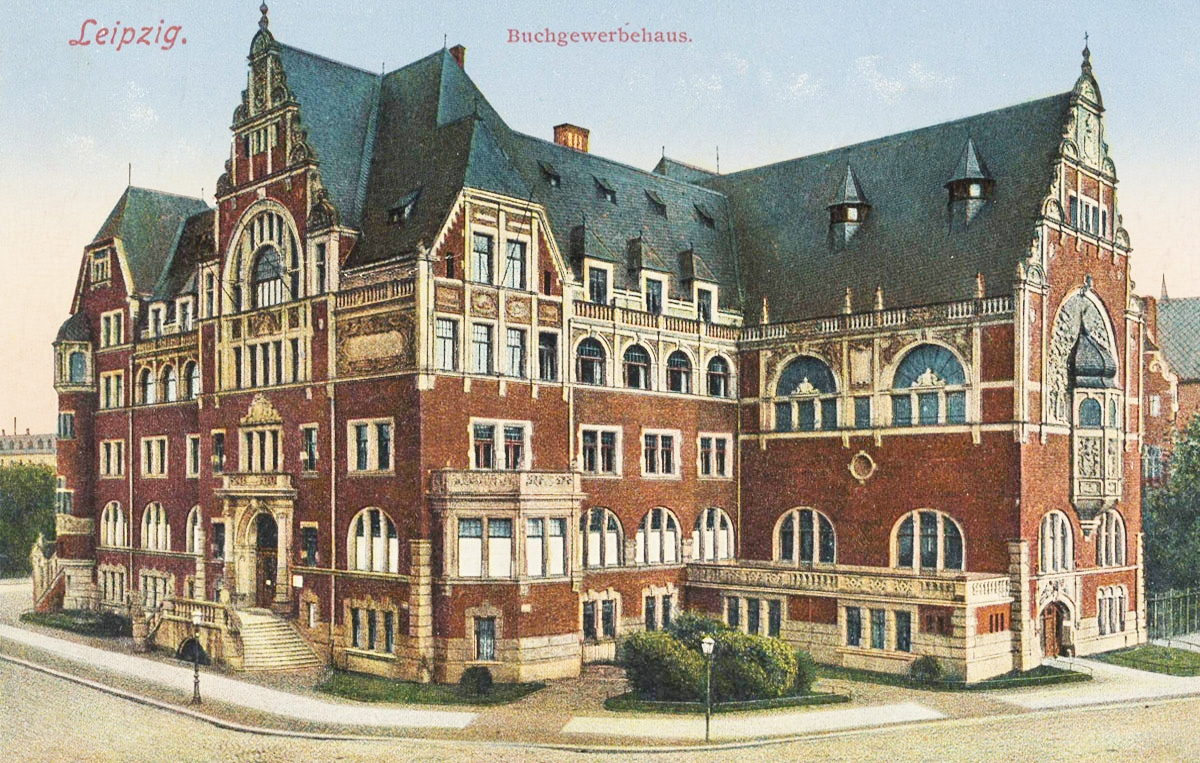
The Deutsches Buchgewerbehaus, circa 1900

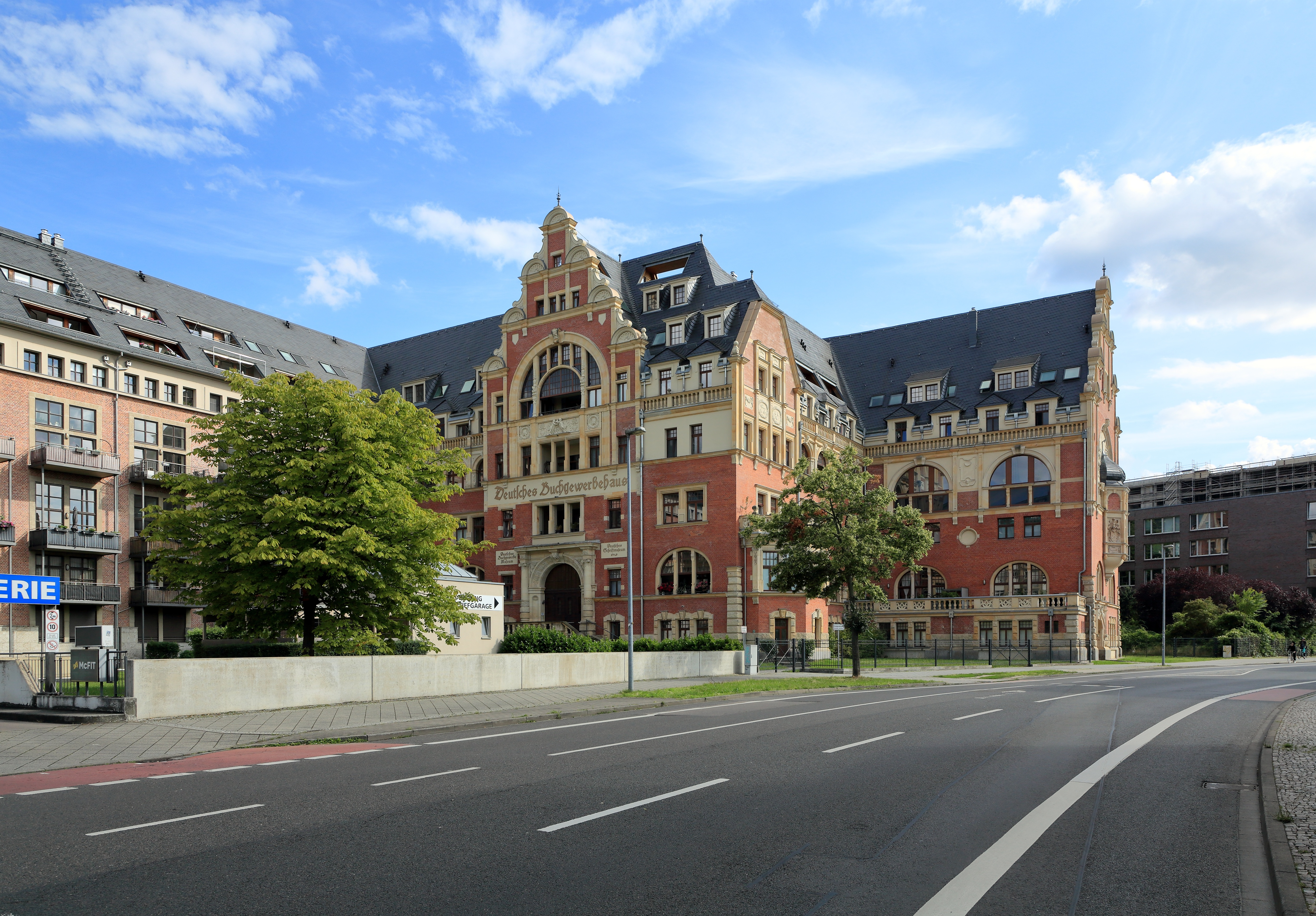
Reconstructed Buchgewerbehaus, 2025 (left: the 1938 extension)

The German Book Trades House (German: Deutsches Buchgewerbehaus) is an historic structure in Leipzig, Germany. It formerly served as the headquarters of the German Book Trades Association. After expansion for use by the Leipzig Trade Fair, it was also known as the Messehaus Bugra. Partially destroyed during World War II, it was subsequently rebuilt in a makeshift manner. Having undergone a comprehensive reconstruction between 2015 and 2017, today it is used as a residential complex.

== History ==
Founded in 1884, the German Book Trade Association was an umbrella organization for all associations within the German graphic arts industry. Initially, it lacked a building of its own and occupied space in the *Deutsches Buchhändlerhaus*. Between 1898 and 1901, the Swedish architect Emil Hagberg constructed this Neo-Renaissance building. In addition to offices for book trade associations, the building housed exhibition spaces for an annual showcase of new publications, the German Book Trade Museum, and an exhibition of graphic arts machinery.

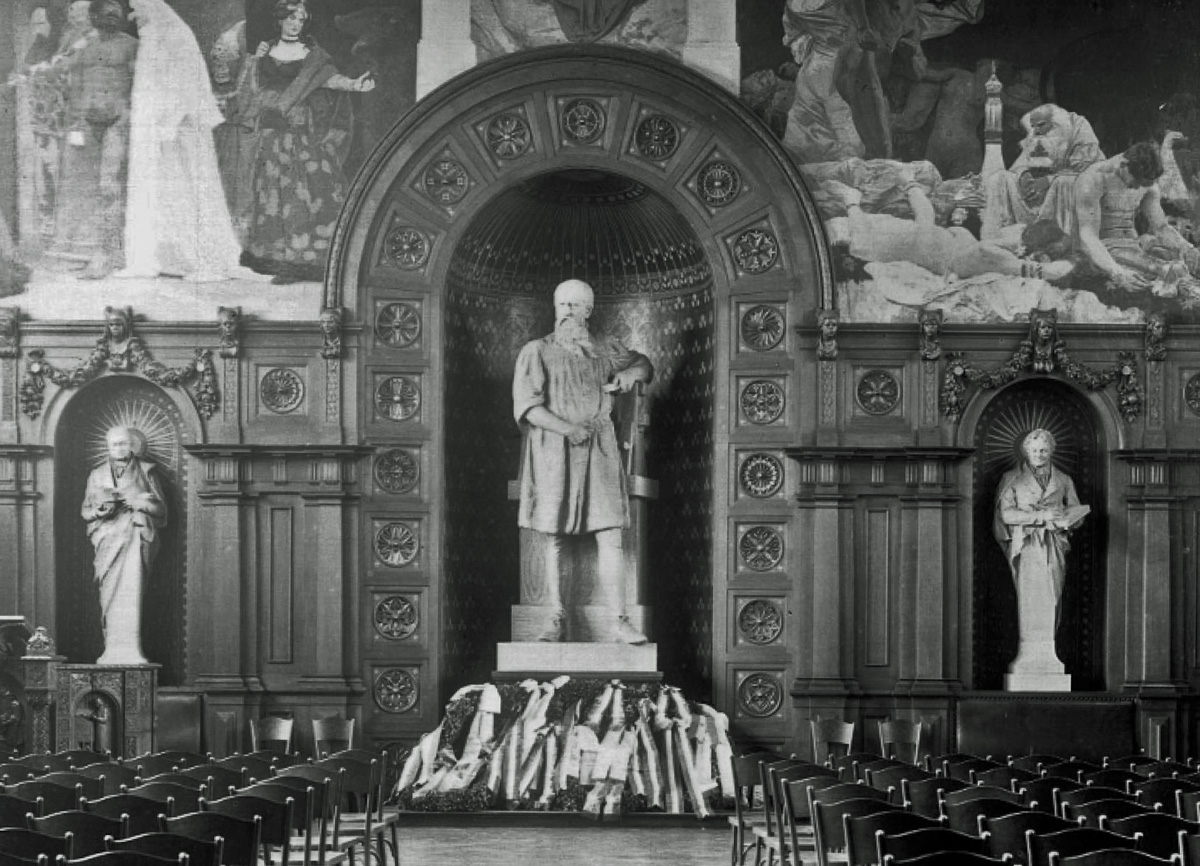
Gutenberghalle – End wall with Gutenberg statue

The building's centerpiece was the twelve-meter-high Gutenberghalle (Gutenberg Hall), designed by Bruno Eelbo as a ceremonial and commemorative space. The three-meter-high statue of Johann Gutenberg, created by Adolf Lehnert, was flanked by portrait busts of Alois Senefelder (inventor of lithography) and Friedrich Koenig (inventor of the a high-speed printing press). The frescoes on the end wall were painted by Sascha Schneider.

In 1943, the Buchgewerbehaus was largely destroyed during an air raid on Leipzig; however, it was rebuilt in a simplified form after 1945 and used as the Bugra trade fair building. The Gutenberg Ceremonial Hall was lost during the post-war reconstruction. Only a windowless oriel—which had previously housed the Gutenberg figure—remained visible on the exterior wall.

A renovation project begun in 1990 failed, leaving the building unused until 2015. Extensive renovation work was carried out between 2015 and 2017. This included reconstructing the roofscape—destroyed during the war—and numerous intricate façade details. The richly decorated oriel window, featuring a portrait of Gutenberg and the coats of arms of the "Black Art" (printers' guild), along with the elaborately stepped Neo-Renaissance gable, once again create a focal point against the red brick façade. Approximately one thousand linear meters of sandstone ornamentation were faithfully restored. In addition, 150 reliefs and ornaments were included. The cost of reconstructing the building and the adjacent Schiemichen Building (erected in 1938 to exhibit printing machinery) exceeded 50 million euros.

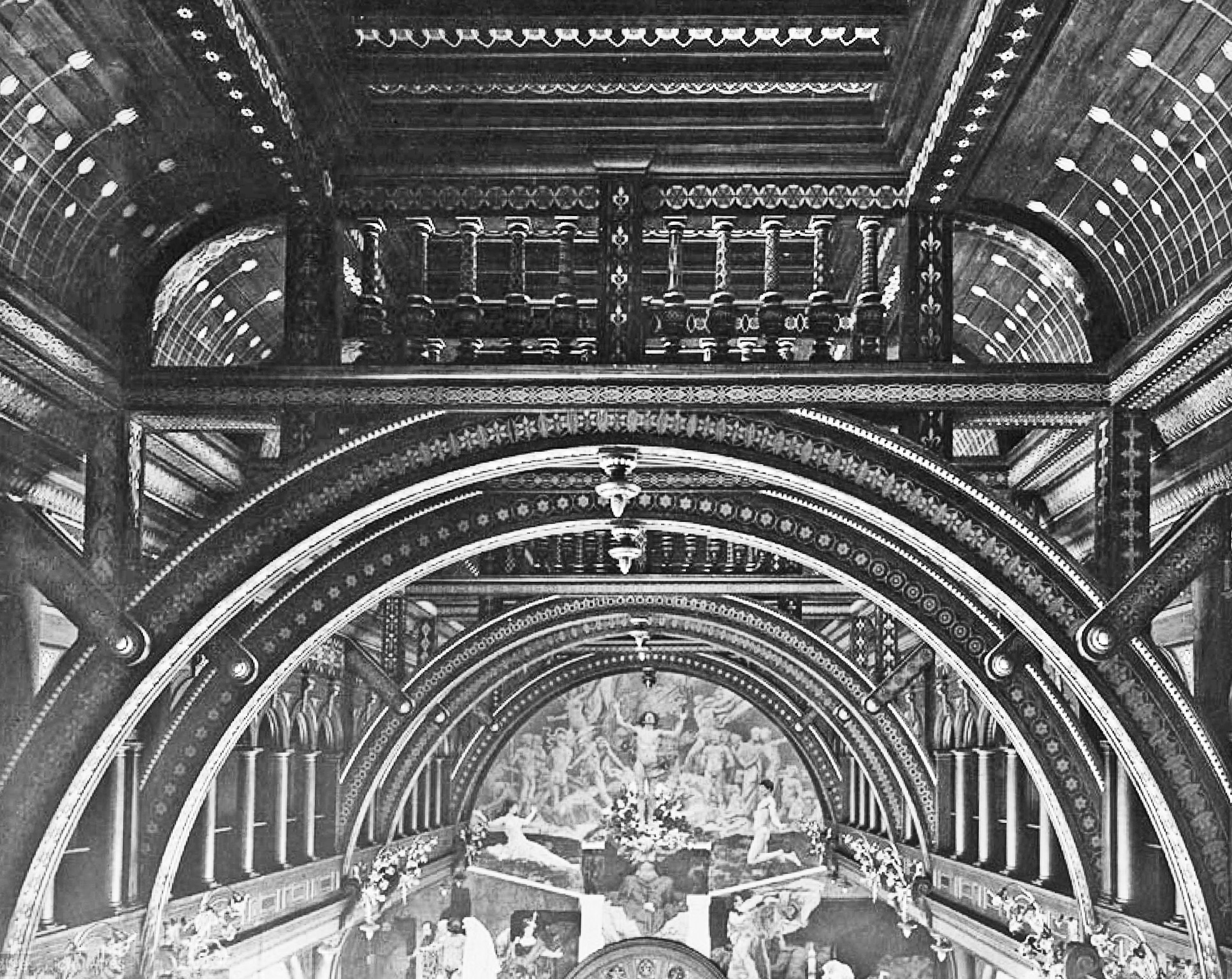
Ceiling of the Gutenberg Hall

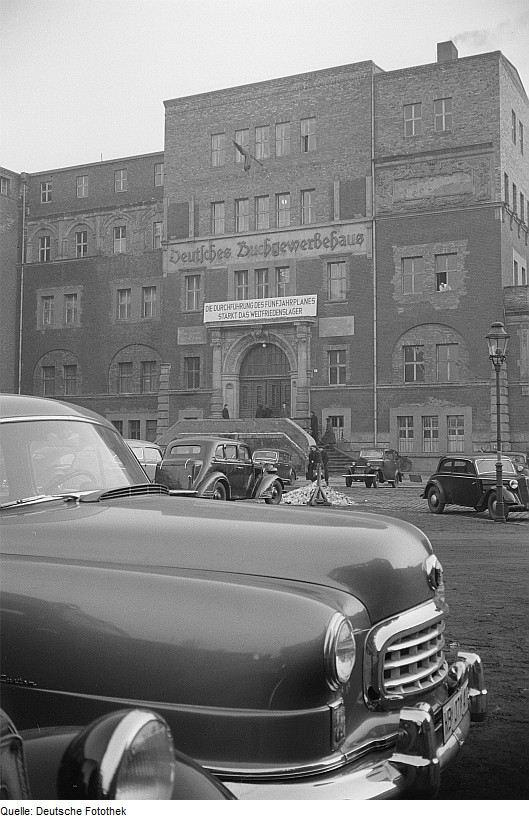
Post-war trade fair, 1951

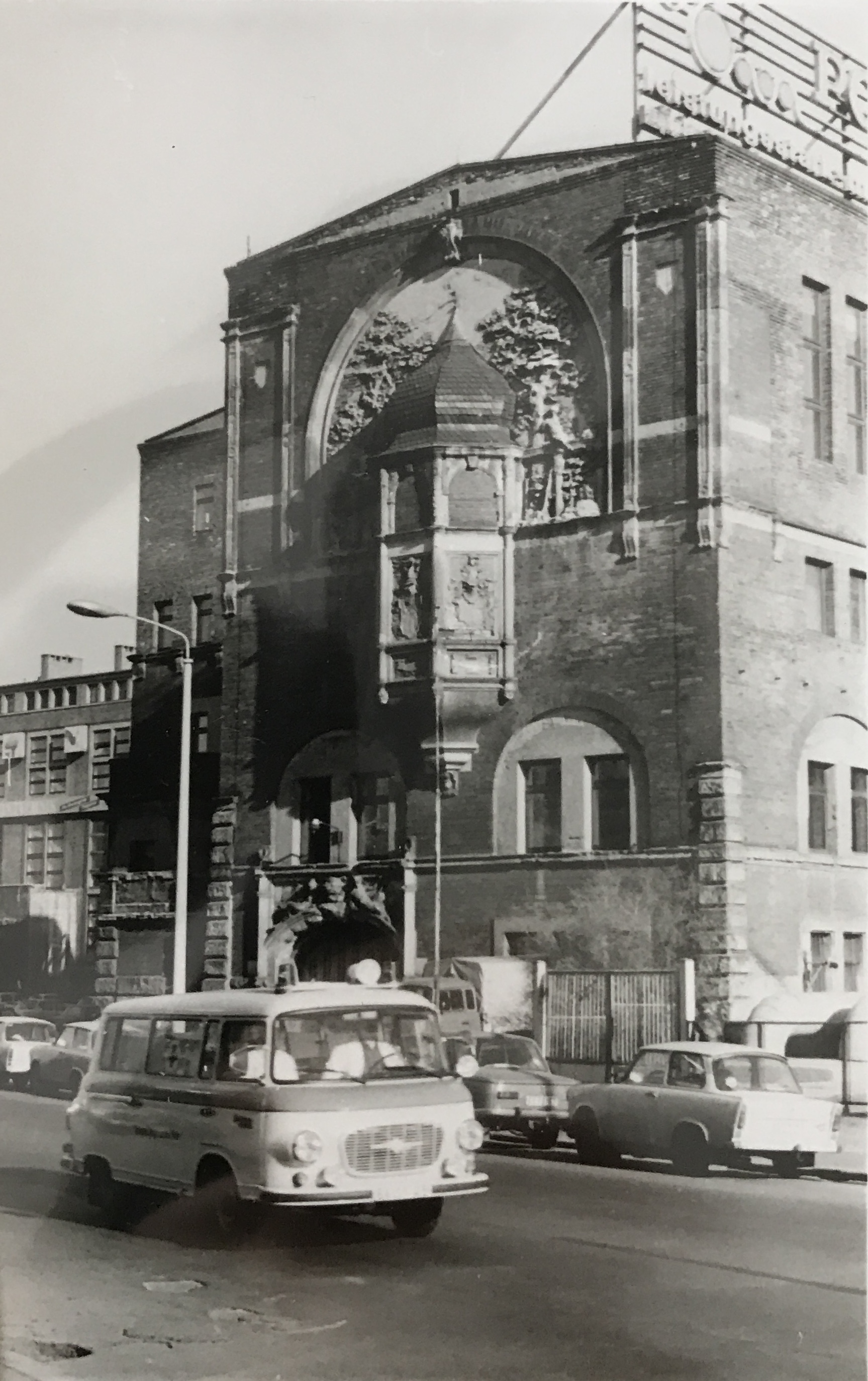
Facade section of the Gutenberg Hall in the 1980s ...

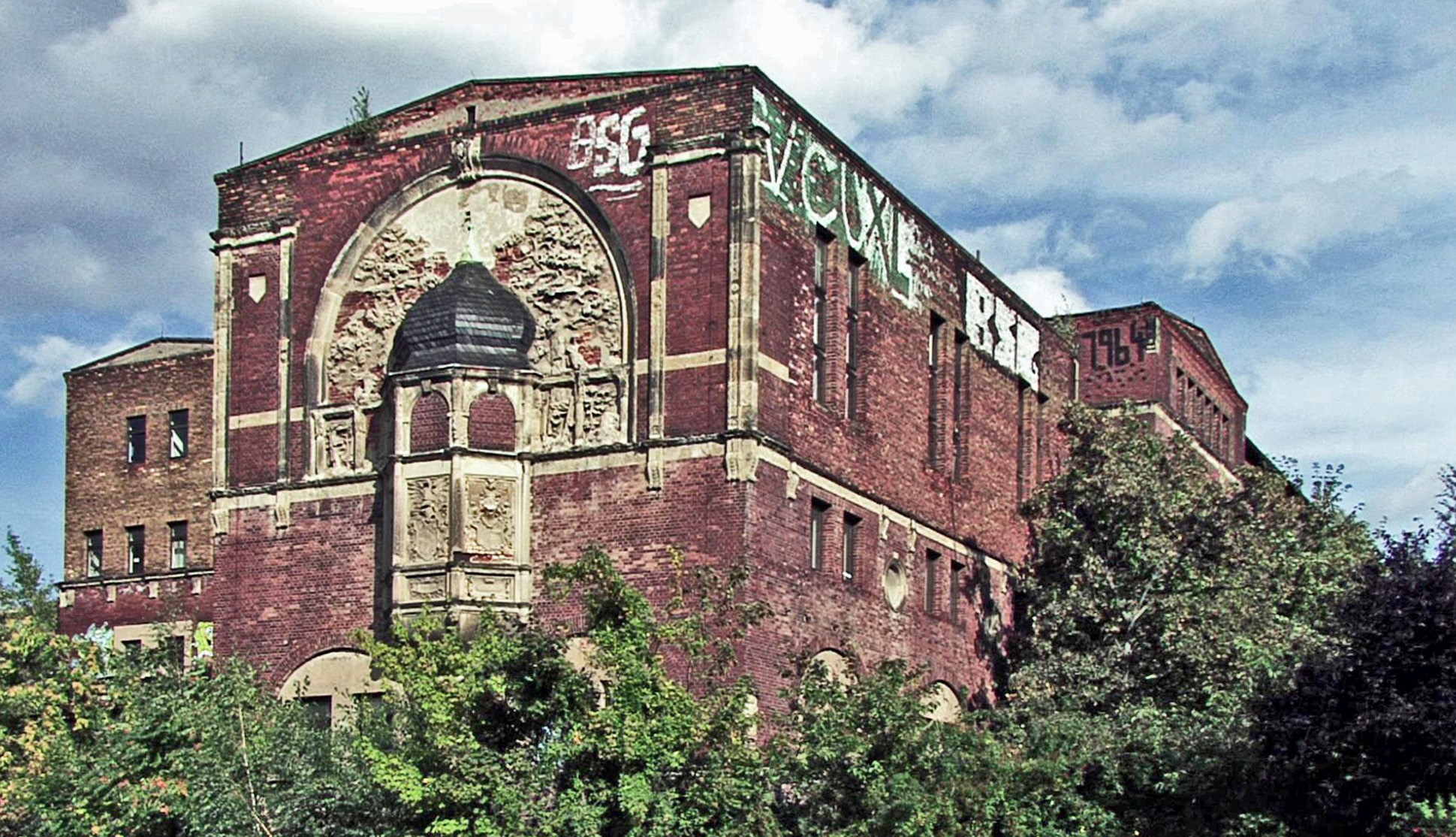
... condition in 2012 ...

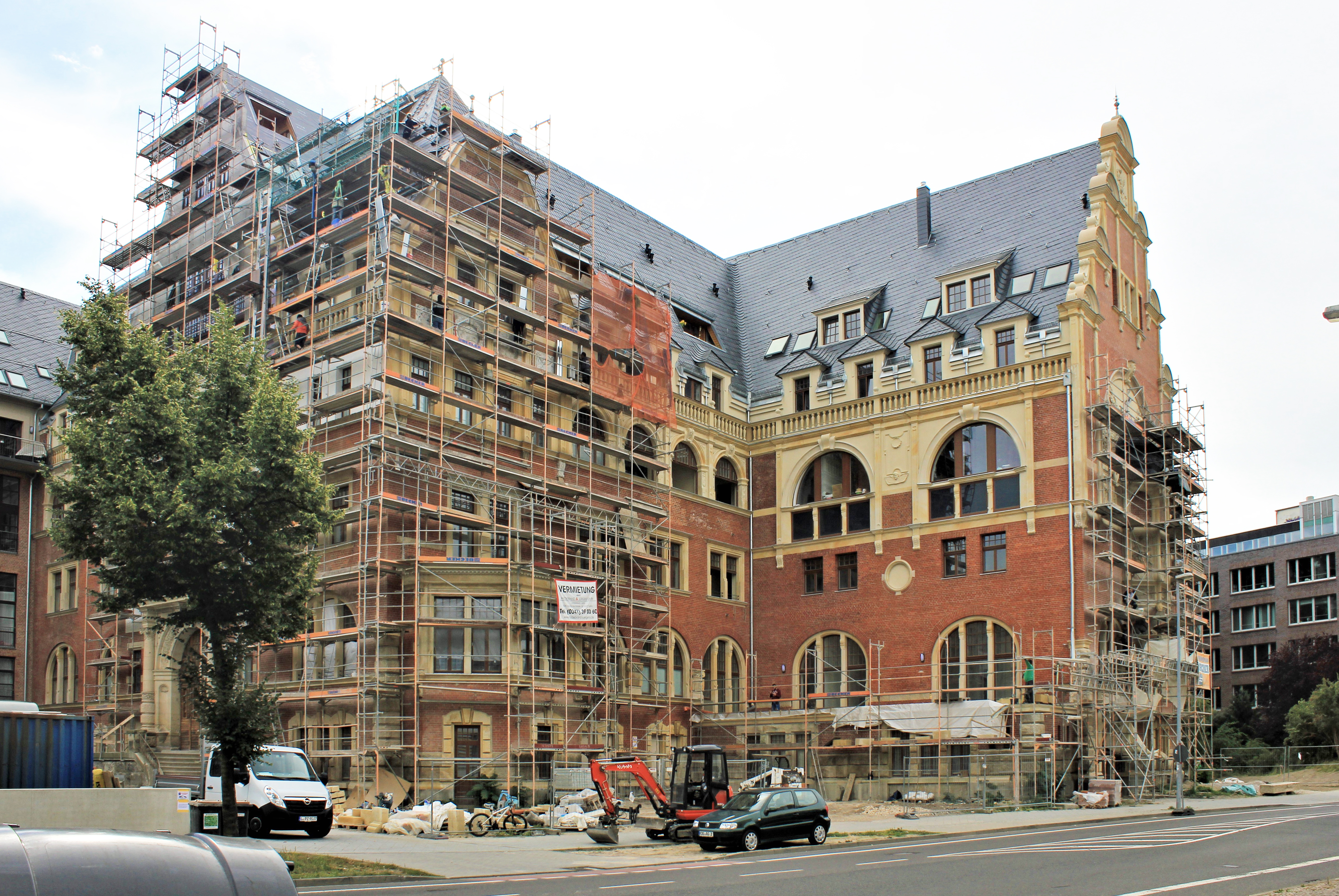
Extensive renovations made in 2017.

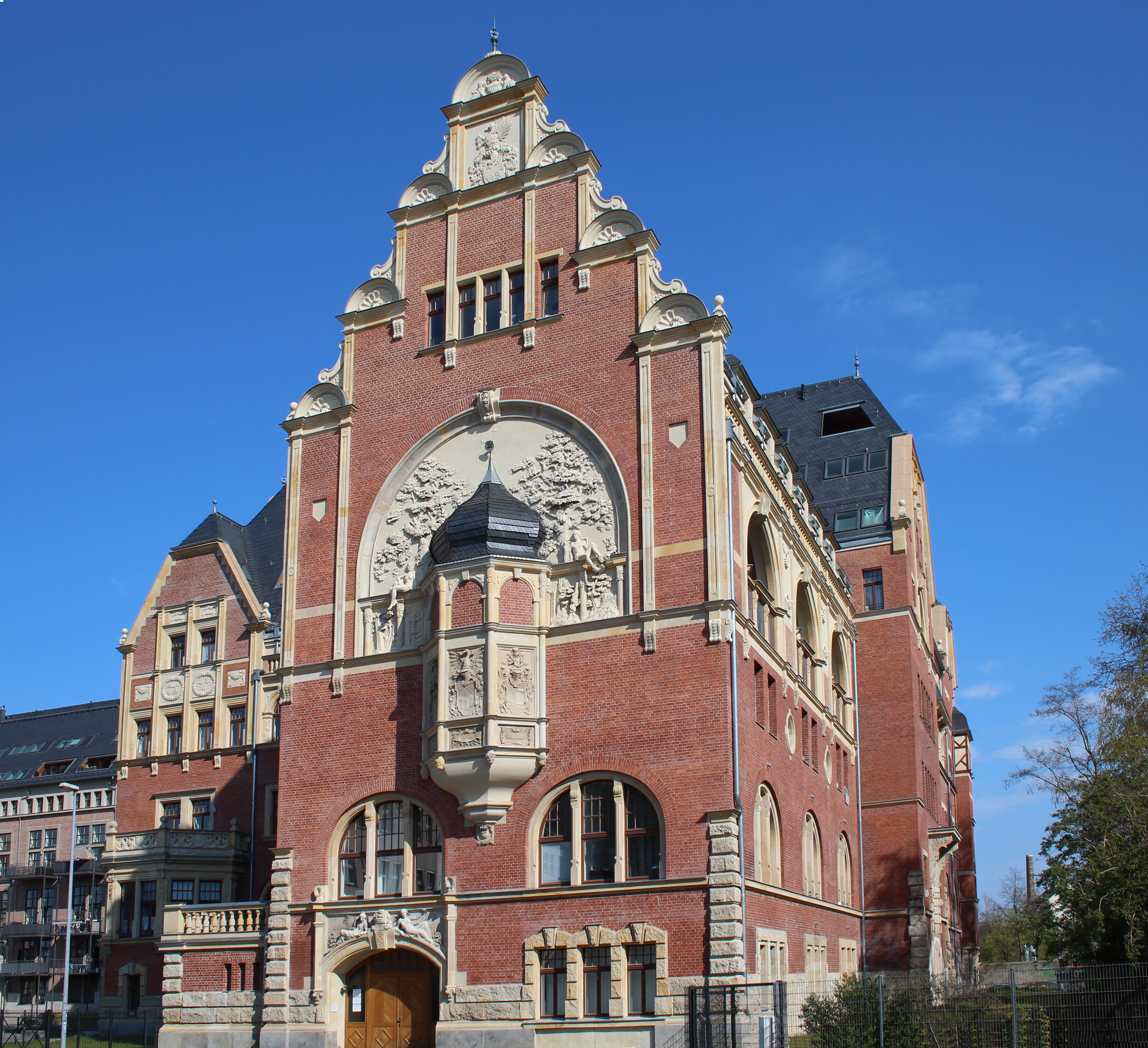
... reconstructed version, 2020

== Literature ==
- Sabine Knopf: Buchstadt Leipzig: Der historische Reiseführer, Christoph Links Verlag, Berlin 2011, ISBN 978-3-86153-634-5, pp. 10 ff.
- Horst Riedel: Stadtlexikon Leipzig von A bis Z. PRO LEIPZIG, Leipzig 2005, ISBN 3-936508-03-8, p. 75
