= Fritz Maenicke =

German sculptor and restorer (1892–1970)

- Born: 23 October 1892; Halle, Germany
- Died: 16 March 1970; Magdeburg, German Democratic Republic
- Occupation(s): sculptor restorer
- Parent: Karl Maenicke

Fritz Maenicke (23 October 1892 – 16 March 1970) was a German sculptor and restorer.

== Life ==
Fritz Maenicke was born in Halle, Germany. Karl Maenicke, his father, was a skilled mechanical engineer ("Maschinenbaumeister"). During his childhood and youth he lived successively in Halle, Cottbus, Falkenberg, Torgau and Leipzig. Between 1907 and 1915 he undertook an apprenticeship at Bruno Wollstädter's sculpture workshop in Leipzig. After receiving his qualification ("Gesellenbrief") he worked as a sculptural assistant between 1911 and 1915, while at the same time attending the Royal Arts Academy ("Königliche Kunstakademie und Kunstgewerbeschule"), as it was known at that time, in Leipzig. At the academy he was a pupil of Adolf Lehnert. During 1913 and 1914 he also studied in Berlin, attending the Arts Academy and the "School for Graphic and Book Art" at the Decorative Arts Museum. His teachers in Berlin included Emil Orlik and Josef Wackerle. In addition, he was accepted into the master classes given by Walther Schmarje.

Maenicke participated in the war as a German soldier between 1915 and 1918, and then returned to Leipzig where he worked as a freelance sculptor. From 1921 till 1932 he returned to his earlier occupation, working as a sculptural assistant. He then moved north to Magdeburg, where between 1932 and 1943 he supported himself as a freelance sculptor. In 1943, despite being over fifty, he was conscripted back into the army.

In 1927 Magdeburg hosted the German Theatre Exhibition in the city's Rotehornpark. Using a draft design from Albin Müller, Maenicke produced his "horse figures" ("Pferdefigur") for the "Pferdetor" entrance to the exhibition. He is also credited by at least one source with having produced the "Magdeburger Maiden" ("Magdeburger Jungfrau") that adorned the corner of the "Lookout Tower" ("Aussichtsturm Rotehornpark"), again using a draft design by Albin Müller. Unlike most of Maenicke's output from this period, both these pieces can still be seen. Also still on display, at the Magdeburg main post office ("Fernmeldeamt"), are Maenicke's four larger-than-life allegorical female figures which adorn the front of the building, representing respectively telephony, telegraphy, letter post, and air mail.

British "carpet bombing" on 16 January 1945 destroyed most of the old centre of Magdeburg, including Maenicke's studio. Much of his life's work was destroyed in a single night. War ended, formally in May 1945, leaving the central portion of Germany, including Magdeburg, Leipzig and much of Berlin, administered as the Soviet occupation zone. For the next few years Maenicke stayed away from his art, working till 1949 for a winery at Roßbach (Naumburg).

In October 1949 the Soviet occupation zone gave way to the Soviet sponsored German Democratic Republic (East Germany). Maenicke resumed his artistic activity in 1950, producing a series of high quality pieces. In 1955 he moved back to Magdeburg. He had already been in contact with the new country's Institute for the Care of National Monuments ("Institut für Denkmalpflege") over plans to restore The Magdeburg Knight ("der Magdeburger Reiter"), a medieval statue of international significance. The Magdeburg Knight restoration became an important project, on which he worked between 1957 and 1961. Following further restoration, the statue is in the Kulturhistorisches Museum Magdeburg, while a copy has been placed in the city's old market place. The other principal focus of his work during these years, in which he was assisted by Heinrich Apel, was an extensive programme of sculptural restoration in Magdeburg Cathedral which had been very badly damaged by bombing during the war. Over the ensuing years he was also closely involved in a succession of other restoration projects in churches, abbeys and castles in the region now known as Sachsen-Anhalt.

== Celebration ==
In 1963 Fritz Meinicke received the National Prize of the German Democratic Republic, Class III for Arts and Literature. Later the city of Magdeburg named a new street "Fritz-Maenicke-Straße" in his honour.
