= Reichshund =

German term for Chancellor Bismarck's dogs

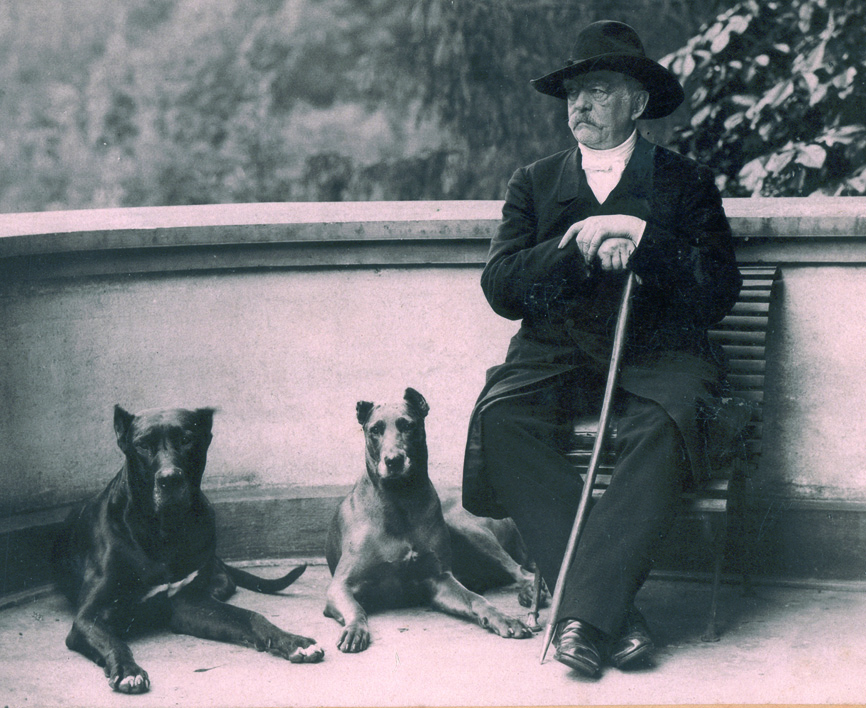
Otto von Bismarck with Tyras II and Rebecca in 1891

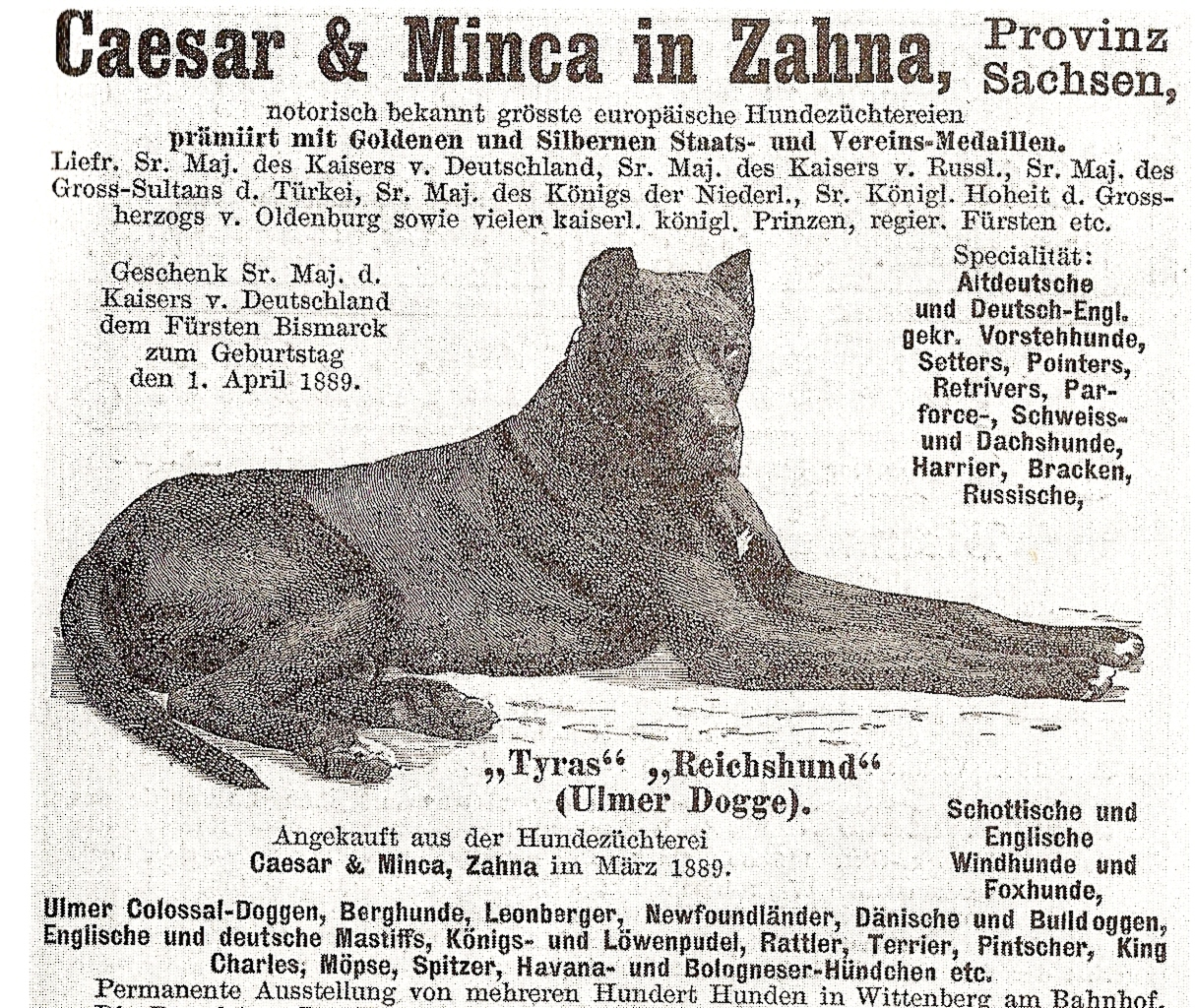
1895 advertisement by dog breeder featuring Tyras II, the Reichshund given to Bismarck by Emperor Wilhelm II

Reichshund ("dog of the Empire") was an informal term used in Germany for Reichskanzler Otto von Bismarck's dogs and more generally for similar dogs, particularly Great Danes.

== Bismarck's dogs ==
Keeping dogs in Germany became increasingly fashionable as the 19th century continued, and people in public life often did so as part of their image. Bismarck reportedly took a blonde Great Dane called Ariel with him when he entered the University of Göttingen in 1832. He continued to keep Great Danes throughout the rest of his life. (Note: Occasionally the dogs are described as bulldogs, for example: Christopher McIntosh, The Swan King: Ludwig II of Bavaria, rev. ed. London: Tauris, 2012, ISBN 9781848858473, p. 172, Klaus Schlichtmann, Japan in the World: Shidehara Kijūrō, Pacifism, and the Abolition of War, AsiaWorld, Lanham, Maryland: Lexington, 2009, ISBN 9780739126752, n. 222, p. 88, quoting a speech by Kijūrō Shidehara, or mastiffs, for example: Frank Preston Stearns, The Life of Prince Otto Von Bismarck, Philadelphia/London: Lippincott, 1899, OCLC 18998727, p. 423, David Clay Large, Berlin, New York: Basic, 2000, ISBN 9780465026463, quoting Baroness von Spitzenberg, James Bryce, Viscount Bryce, "Lecture V. Diplomacy and International Law", in: International relations: Eight Lectures Delivered in the United States in August, 1921, The Institute of politics publications, Williams College, New York: Macmillan, 1922, OCLC 1550278, pp. 148–75, p. 152: "a wolfhound, or something between a wolfhound and a mastiff".) His favourite was Sultan (shortened to 'Sultl' to avoid diplomatic repercussions with Turkey); on his deathbed he berated himself for not treating the dog better. Sultan was a gift from the Bavarian Count Holnstein. After Sultan's death on 26 October 1877, Bismarck could only be consoled by the gift of another Great Dane from Count Holnstein, Tyras. Tyras died on 18 January 1889; Emperor Wilhelm II gave Bismarck Tyras II for his birthday the following April 1. The dog died on 11 May 1896.

Bismarck also owned female Great Danes named Flora (nicknamed 'Flörchen'), who was Sultan's mate, and finally Rebecca (nicknamed Beckchen), who died in 1897. After receiving Tyras II from the emperor, Bismarck regretfully gave Tyras I's offspring, Cyrus, whom he had hand-reared, to his head forester. Bismarck's dogs were buried at his estate in Varzin, in Pomerania (now Warcino, Poland); the gravestones were rediscovered by students at the forestry institute that now occupies the manor.

Accounts of the dogs' temperament vary. Some historians have regarded Bismarck's choice of the largest available breed and his habit of having a dog with him, which would disconcert foreign diplomats, as calculated demonstrations of power. Former diplomat James Bryce, Viscount Bryce referred to the dog as "now and then growl[ing] and show[ing] its teeth in a threatening way", and diplomat and President of Japan Kijūrō Shidehara said in a speech that "the dog threatened to bite anyone who would provoke his master's displeasure." Robert K. Massie describes Tyras as "terrori[sing] the Chancellory staff" and writes that those who spoke with Bismarck were "advised to make no unusual gestures which Tyras might interpret as threatening." On the other hand Tyras was said by one contemporary to have "never been guilty of any such ill-mannered act before" his celebrated misbehaviour, and the English periodical The Spectator described him at the time as "a very quiet creature, with a most pacific reputation."

== Public attention ==
Bismarck's dogs came to the public's attention and began to be called 'Reichshund' after Tyras attacked the Russian chancellor, Alexander Gorchakov, at the Congress of Berlin in 1878. In some accounts, he knocked him to the ground, according to Massie after he raised his arm to make a point, but according to The Spectator after he had stumbled and Bismarck had rushed to aid him. However, Kladderadatsch published a front-page poem describing him as having torn the envoy's trousers. Its title was "An den Reichshund" - "To the Dog of the Empire". The poem misidentifies the offending dog as Sultan, who had already died.

The term Reichshund came to be used for Great Danes or similar dogs in general. In Nancy Mitford's Wigs on the Green Eugenia's "enormous mastiff" is called the Reichshund "after Bismarck's dog".

Some of the statues of Bismarck in Germany depict him with a dog, for example Max Klein's statue of him in Grunewald, Berlin (1897; melted down during World War II and recreated by Harald Haacke in 1996), Adolf Lehnert's statue of him in the Johannapark in Leipzig with a dog for whom Tyras II served as model (1895; destroyed) and the statue of a young Bismarck by Norbert Pfretzschner erected by members of the student 'corps' on the Rudelsburg at Bad Kösen in 1896 (destroyed; recasting erected in 2006) depicts him with attributes of a corps member including a dog for whom Tyras I served as model. Late-19th century student corps members included keeping large dogs among their traditions.

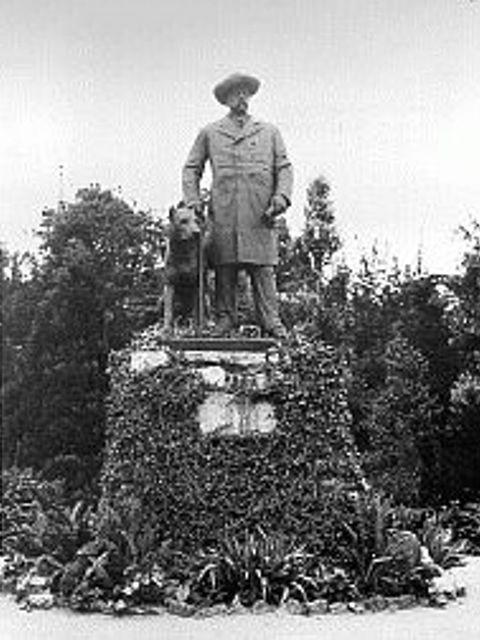
Max Klein's statue of Bismarck with Reichshund in Grunewald (1897)

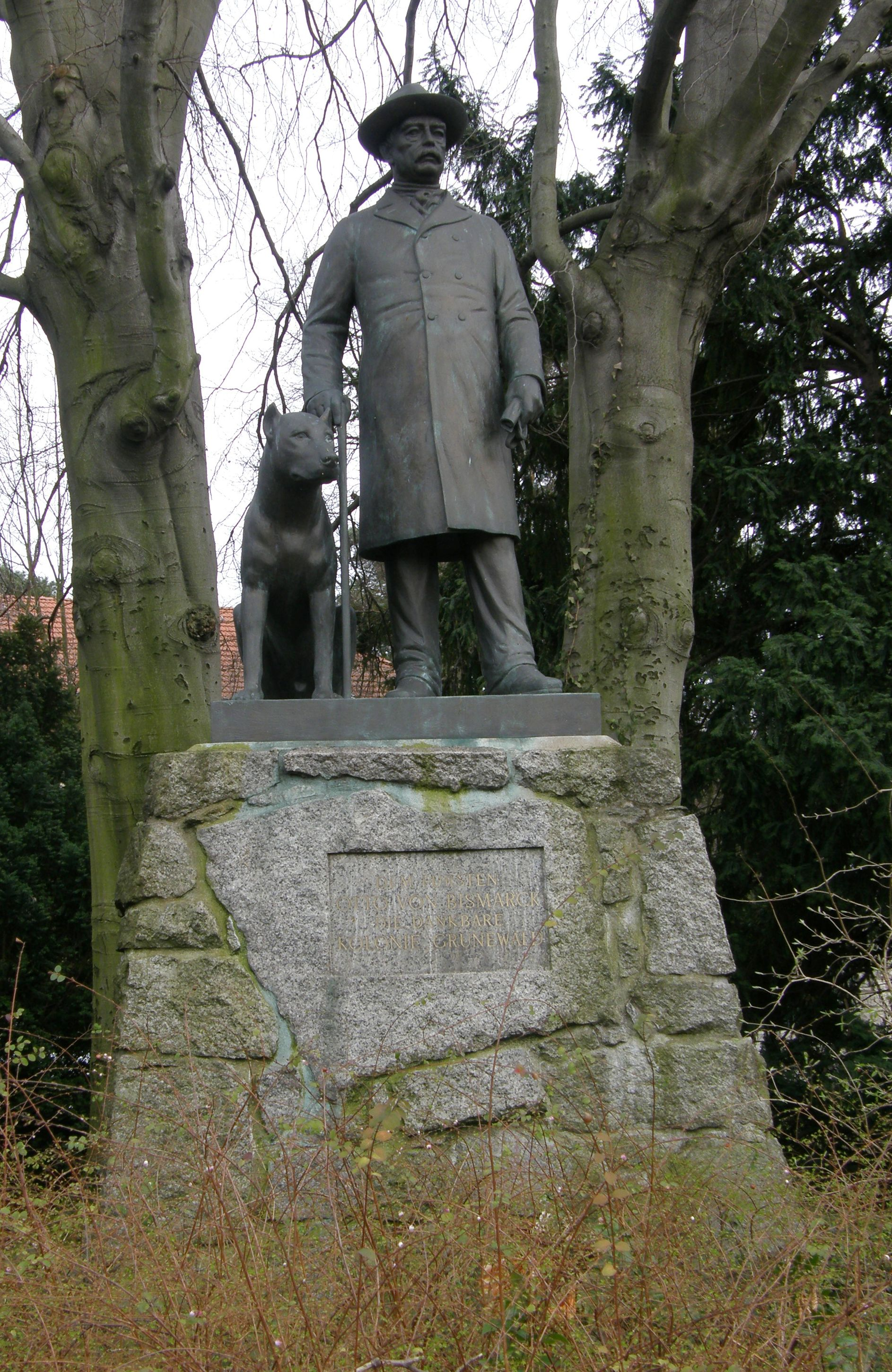
Harold Haacke's recreation of Klein's statue (1996)

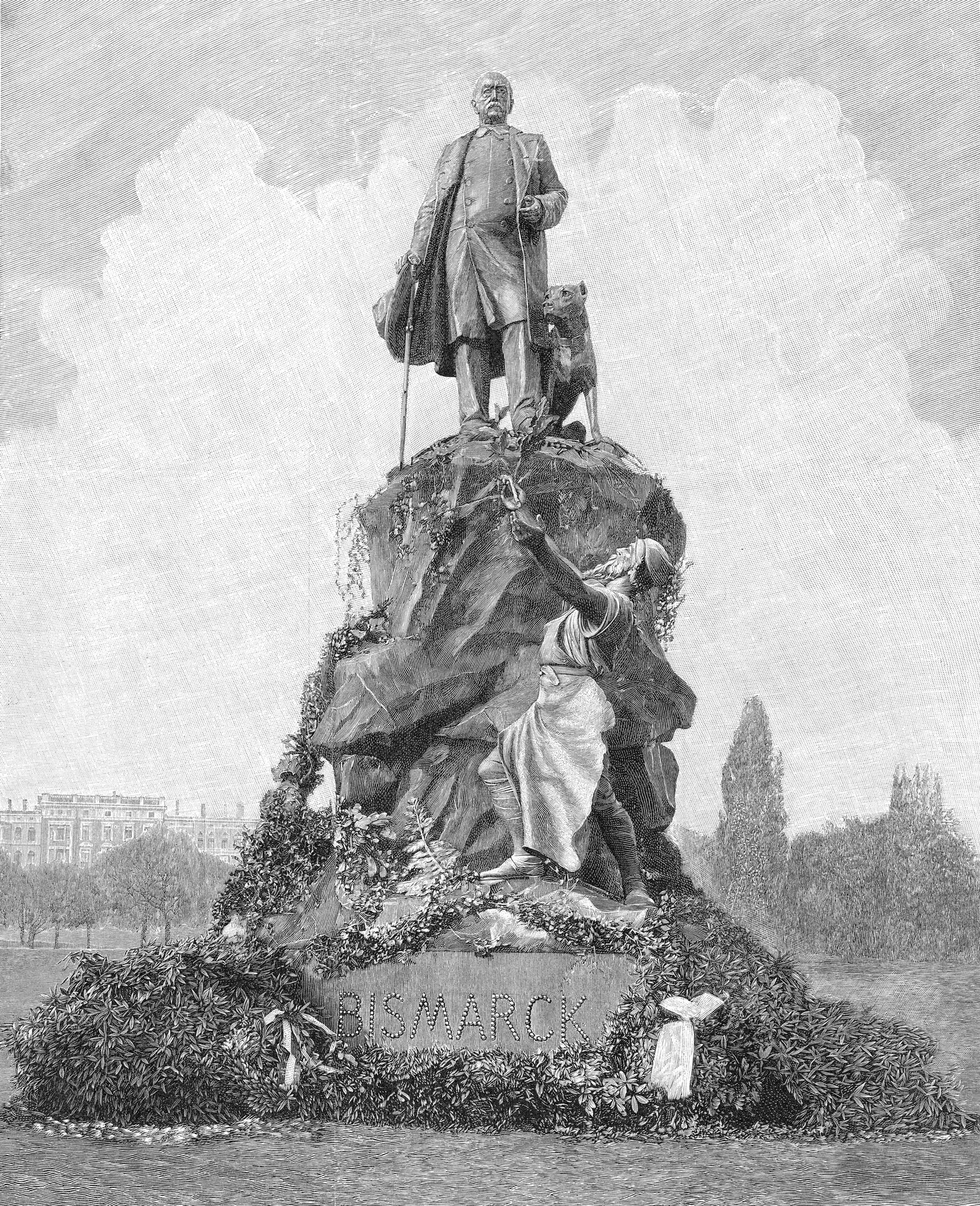
Adolf Lehnert's statue of Bismarck with Reichshund, Johannapark, Leipzig (1897 engraving)

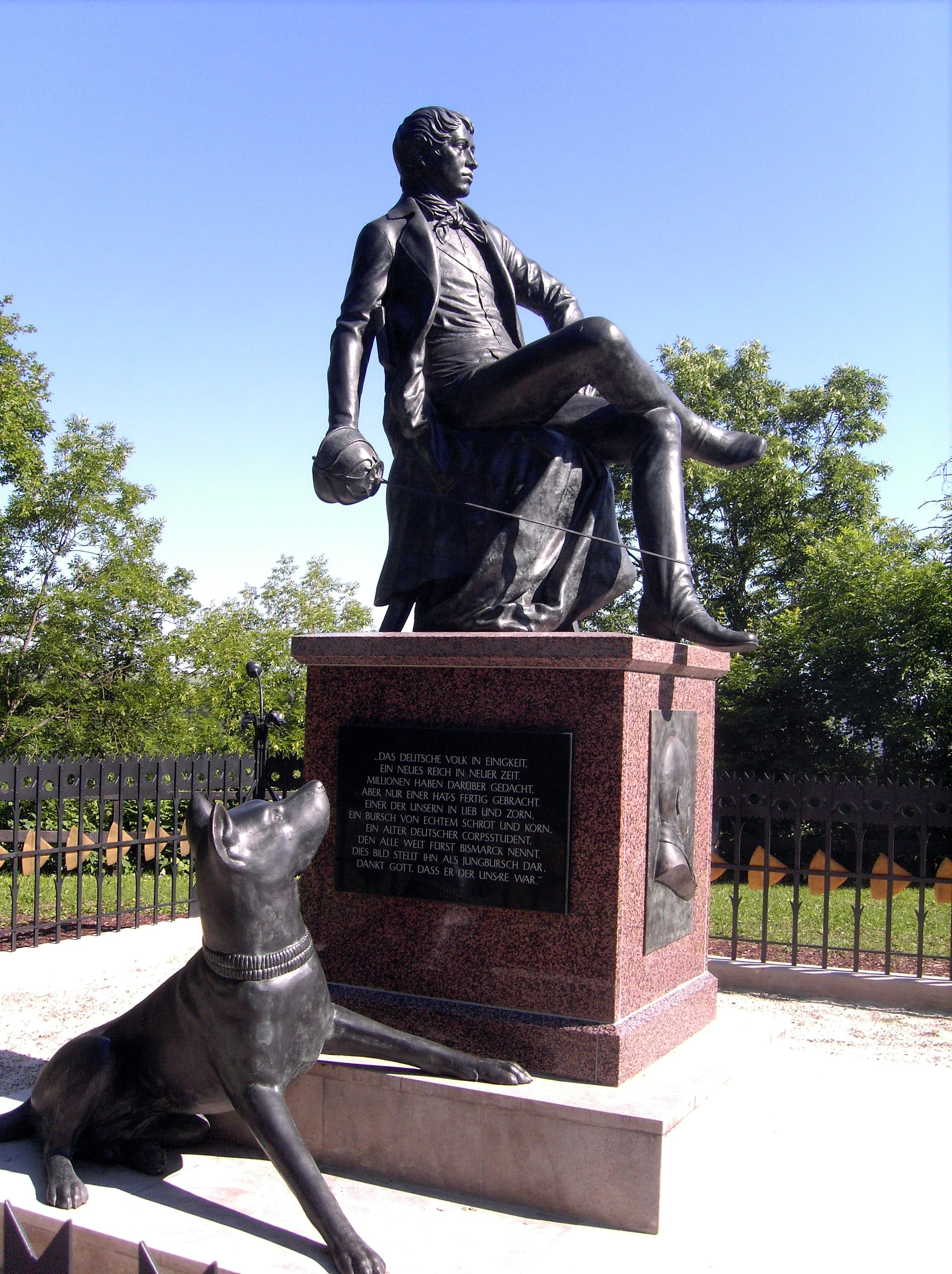
Young Bismarck monument at Rudelsburg, by Norbert Pfretzschner (1896; 2006 recasting)

== See also ==
- List of individual dogs
