= Alfred Thiele =

German sculptor (1886–1957)

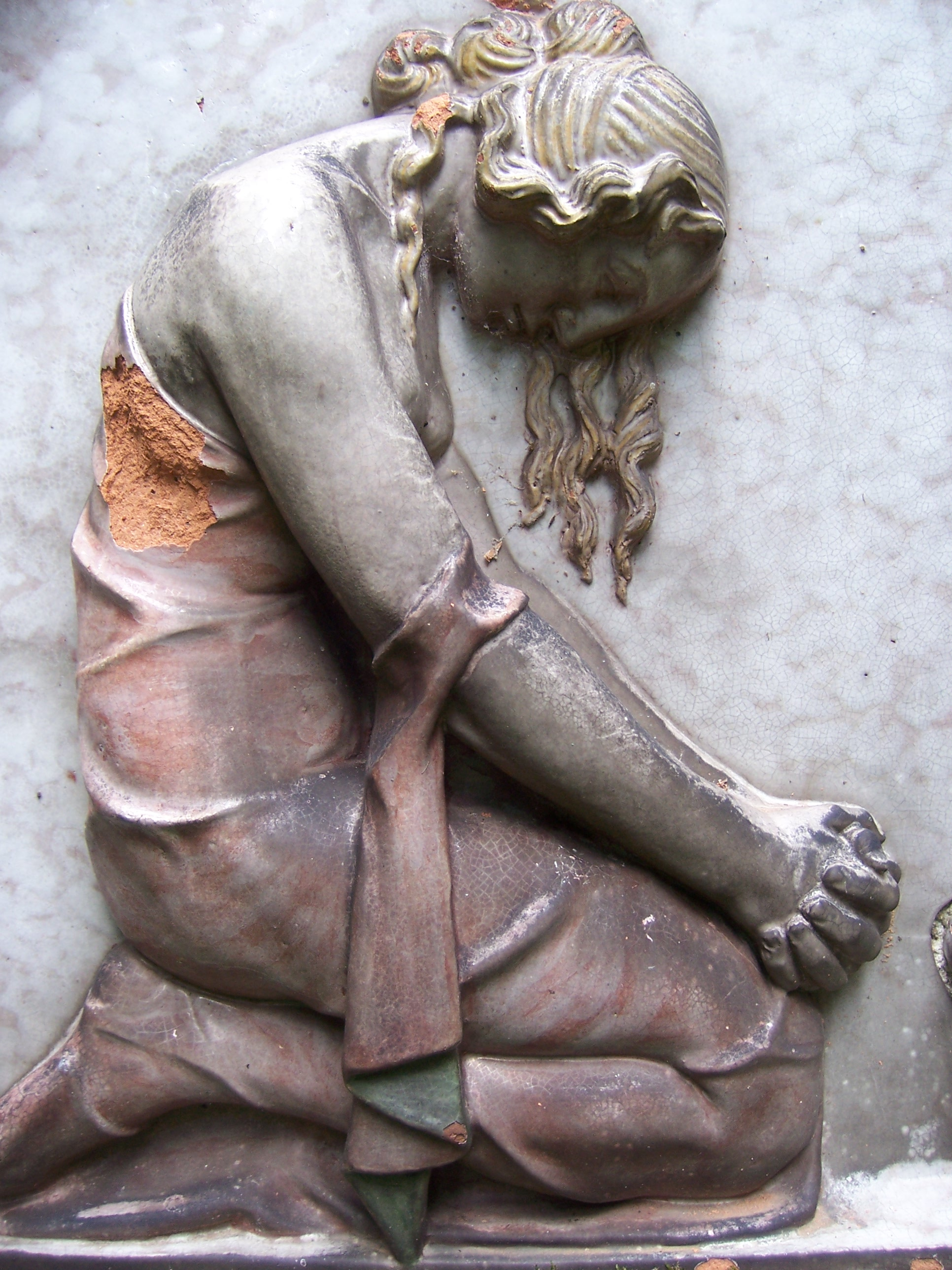
Detail Maiolica relief, 1920

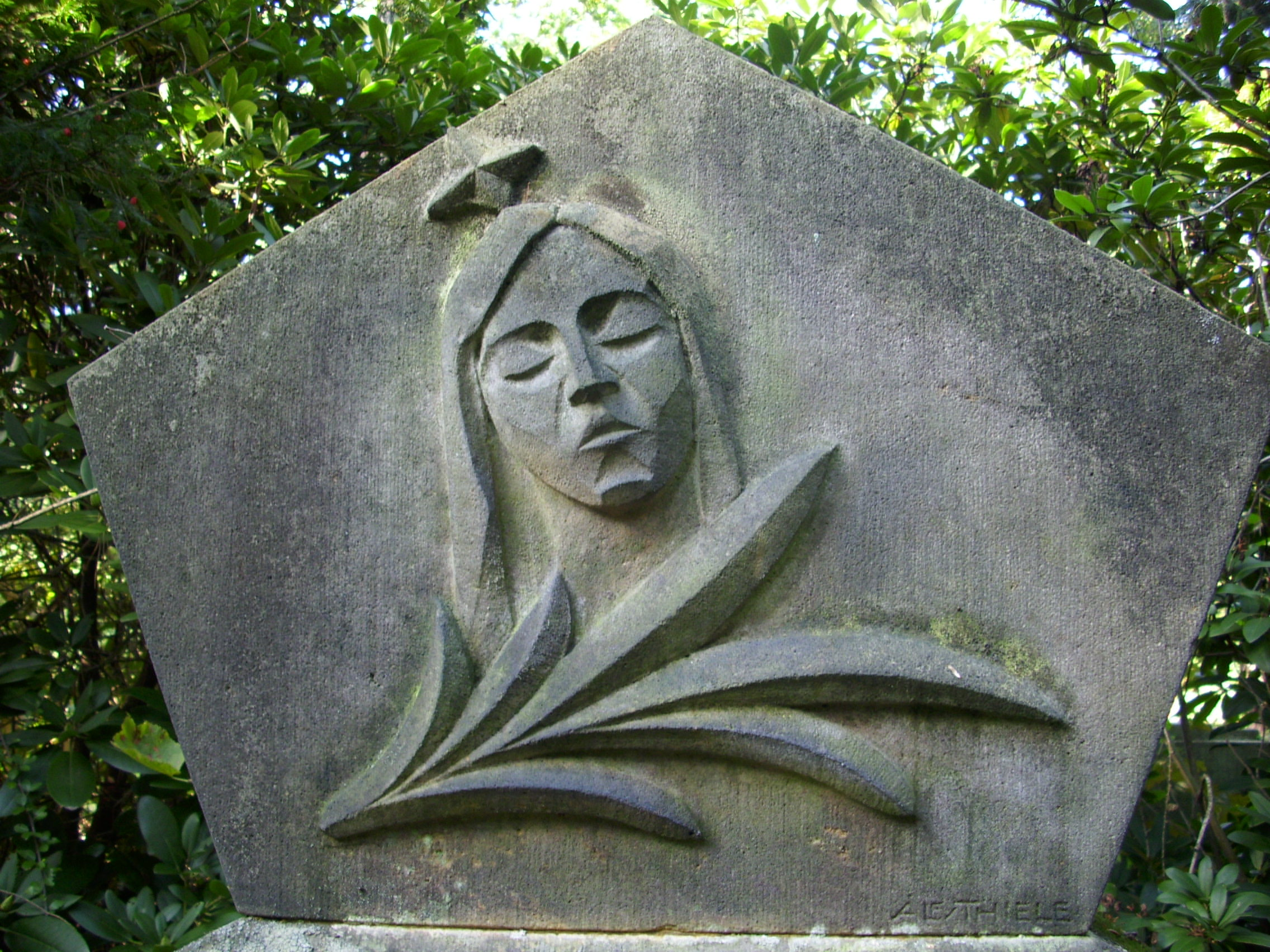
Detail Kratz grave memorial, 1921, South cemetery (Leipzig)

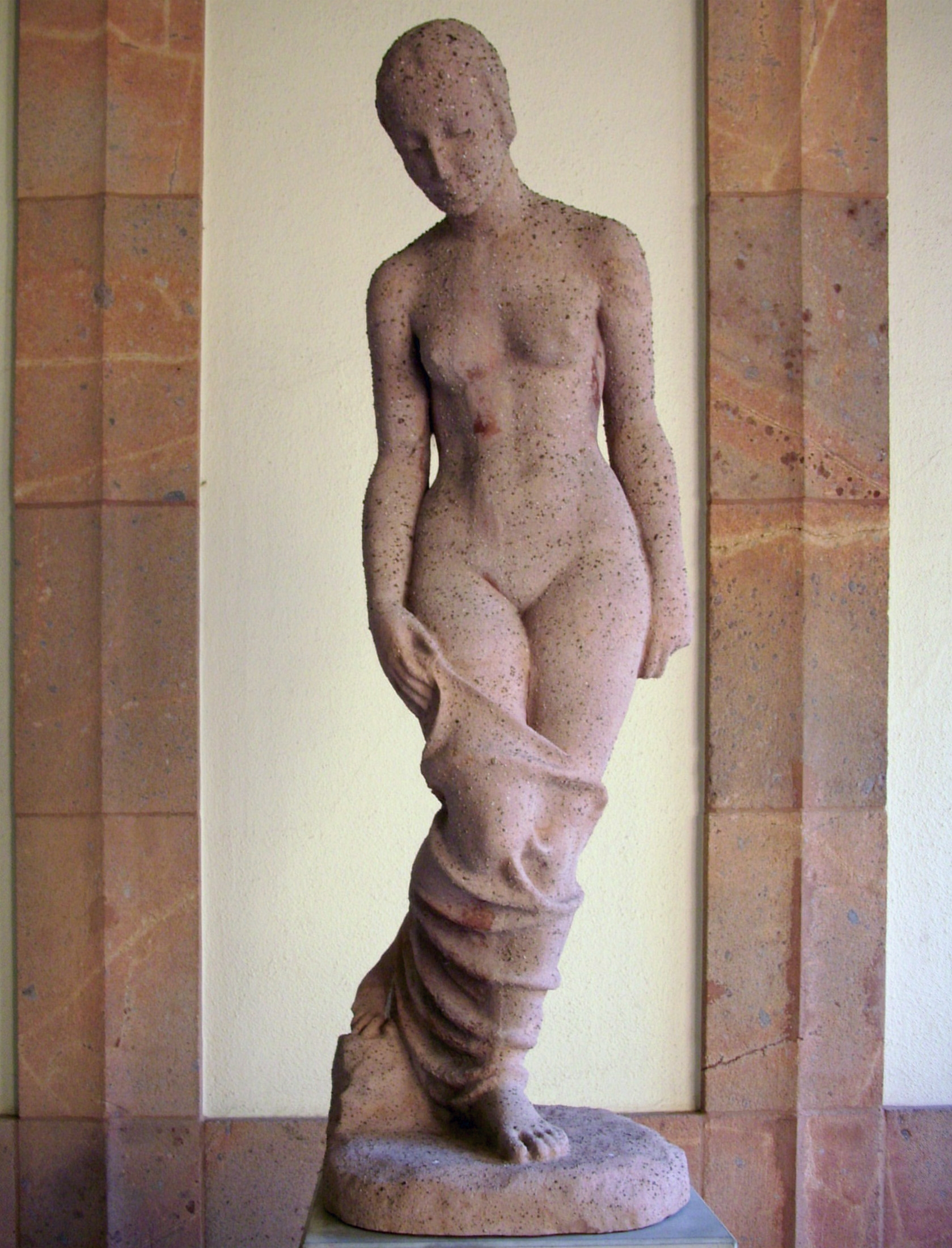
Musing ("Sinnende"), 1929, cement casting

Alfred Thiele (21 September 1886 – 19 September 1957) was a German sculptor, and medallist.

== Life ==
=== Provenance and training ===
Alfred Thiele was born in Leipzig. Carl Thiele (1859–1929), his father, was a book dealer. Alfred's initial training was in stonework and wood carving. Then between 1903 and 1908, he attended the Arts Academy ("Hochschule für Grafik und Buchkunst") in Leipzig. His teachers included Adolf Lehnert and Bruno Héroux.

=== Artist ===
After a short stay in Munich Thiele returned to Leipzig and embarked on a career as a freelance artist. Starting in 1910, his work involved medallions and wall-mounted plaques. From 1911 he became more focused on figurines and participation in exhibitions. His early style reflected the naturalist and Jugendstil influences of the time, but during the 1920s he moved on through expressionism to so-called new realism. Influenced by Aristide Maillol and Wilhelm Lehmbruck, his artistic interest turned towards the presentation of physical movement and expressions of the human body. By 1928 he had become sufficiently well known to justify a newspaper headline that read "There is only one sculptor in Leipzig: Alfred Thiele!" ("Es gibt nur einen Bildhauer in Leipzig: Alfred Thiele!"). During the 1930s he began to apply the skills acquired working on small figures to much larger figures. Thiele applies his outstanding powers of observation, his sense for movement and other specialist abilities to developing a mastery of animal sculptures. Some of his designs were reproduced on an industrial scale by the Schaubach firm, offered as both glazed and unglazed porcelain figures. He also applied himself to statues other adornments for monumental grave stones.

=== Teacher ===
As a teacher, and later as director for sculpture classes at the Leipzig Arts Academy between 1921 and 1953, Thiele exercised a great influence. One example (among many) was setting up a close collaborative relationship between the academy and the city zoo which created a tradition of animal sculpture in Leipzig which endures to this day.

His pupils, in both a narrow and a broader sense, included Max Alfred Brumme, Hellmuth Chemnitz, Kurt Kluge, Rudolf Oelzner, Alfred Sabisch, Fritz Zalisz, Walter Arnold, Elfriede Ducke, Gisela Richter-Thiele, Hans-Joachim Förster, Bruno Kubas, Gunter Morgner, Rolf Nagel and Rolf Szymanski.

== Output (selection) ==
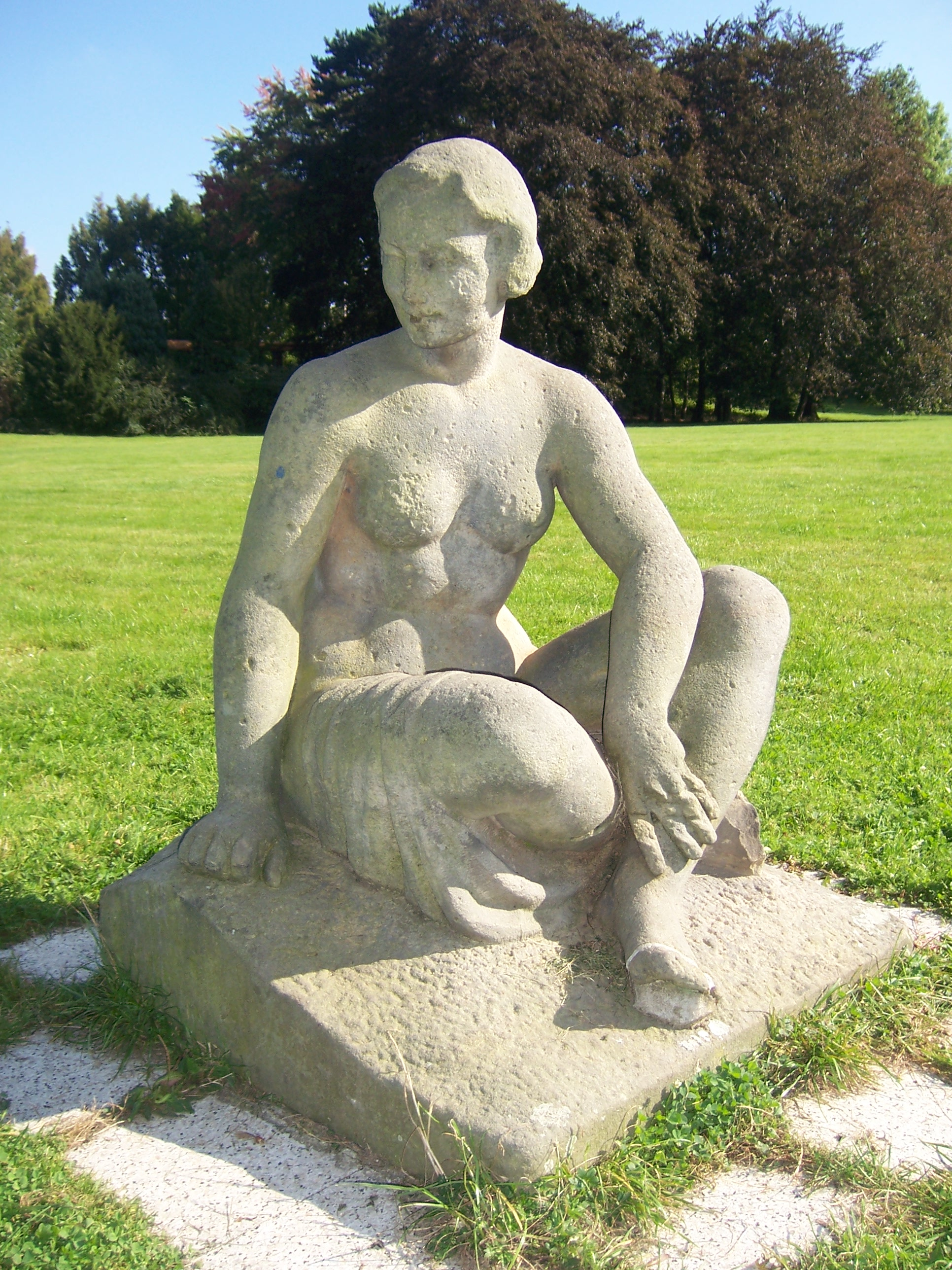
Sitting in the Herfurthsche Villa Park, 1939

- 1917 Tanzender weiblicher Akt, Bronze auf Serpentinsockel
- 1918 Porträtrelief Karl Kaiser und König von Österreich-Ungarn, Bronze
- 1919 Fliehende Daphne, Bronze auf Marmorsockel
- 1919 Kriegerdenkmal, Leisnig
- 1920 Majolikarelief Grabstätte Degener, Südfriedhof Leipzig
- 1921 Frauenkopf, fränkischer Muschelkalk
- 1921 Porträtrelief Wilhelm Felsche, Bronze
- 1924 Figur Seele, Bronze
- 1924 Hockender Akt, Bronze
- 1924 Trampeltier, Bronze
- 1925 Löwe, Bronze auf Marmorsockel
- 1925 Sitzende, Bronze
- 1925 Anbetende, Bronze auf Muschelkalksockel
- 1926 Leopard, an der Pfote leckend, Bronze
- 1927 Springender Hengst, Bronze auf Holzsockel
- 1927 Porträtrelief Arthur Hantzsch, Bronze
- 1928 Laufendes Dromedar, Bronze auf Marmorplinthe
- 1928 Bildnisköpfe in Terrakotta mit leichter Einfärbung von Haar und Lippen
- 1929 Schlafender Löwe, Grabstätte Wetzold, fränkischer Muschelkalkstein, Südfriedhof Leipzig
- 1929 Sinnende, Zementguss, Grassimuseum Leipzig
- 1929 Schreitende, Bronze (from 2012: Museum für angewandte Kunst, Leipzig)
- 1932 Liegendes Gnu, Bronze
- 1933 Lautenspielerin, Zementguss
- 1933 Porträtrelief Julius Klengel, Bronze
- 1936 Johannisfigur am Johannishospital in Leipzig
- 1937 Korbtragende Frau, Kolossalstatue, Wohnhaus Johannisplatz, Leipzig
- 1938 Polospieler, Bronze
- 1938 Nach abgeworfenem Speer, Bronze
- 1938 Liegender Baisabock, Bronze
- 1938 Panther, an Pfote leckend, Bronze
- 1938 Liegender Tiger, Bronze
- 1941 Der Morgen, Bronze
- 1941 Pelikan, Bronze
- 1942 Liegender Gepard, Bronze auf Muschelkalksockel
- 1947 Stehende, Bronze
- 1948 Witternder Tiger, Bronze
- 1949 Kumpel vor der Einfahrt, Bronze
- 1949 Laufende Giraffe, Bronze
- 1950 Relief Arbeit und Handel, Messehofpassage Leipzig
- 1951 Reliefs, Ranstädter Steinweg, Leipzig
- 1953–55 Bauplastik, Ringbebauung Rossplatz, Leipzig
- 1956 Liegendes Guanako, Bronze
