= Adolf Lehnert =

German sculptor

Adolf Lehnert (20 July 1862 – 6 January 1948) was a Leipzig sculptor and medal designer.

== Life ==
=== Family ===
Franz Robert Adolf Lehnert was born in Leipzig, the second of his parents' twelve recorded children. His father, also called Adolf Lehnert, was an engine driver. His mother, born Lina Werner, was originally from Borna (to the southeast of the city).

In 1889 Lehnert married Else Riedel, daughter of the composer-musical director Carl Riedel. This connected him to one of Leipzig's leading artistic families. The marriage was childless and Else died in 1907. Lehnert's second marriage was to Johanna Wildenhayn (1875–1957). This marriage resulted in two recorded children: Siegfried (1910–1941) and Waltraut (1916–2007).

=== Education ===
After leaving school Adolf Lehnert studied at the Leipzig Arts Academy between 1880 and 1888. His principal teacher was Melchior zur Straßen. At the academy's annual exhibitions of its students' work he received a bronze medal in 1882 and a silver medal in 1885. After completion of his course at the academy he undertook a further study year in Rome and Paris.

=== Teaching ===
Between 1896 and 1924 Lehnert taught at the Arts Academy. Early on he was invited to deputise for his teacher, Melchior zur Straßen. After the latter suddenly died Lehnert was officially appointed to succeed him as head of the sculpture classes with effect from 1 December 1897. Topics he taught included "Still life forms", "Life model forms" and "Measures of the human form". In 1907 he was given the title of "Professor". His students included Kurt Schmid-Ehmen, Bruno Eyermann, Fritz Zalisz, Fritz Maenicke, Albrecht Leistner, Max Alfred Brumme, Paul Stuckenbruck and Alfred Thiele. It was Thiele who would succeed him as head of the sculpture department at the Arts Academy.

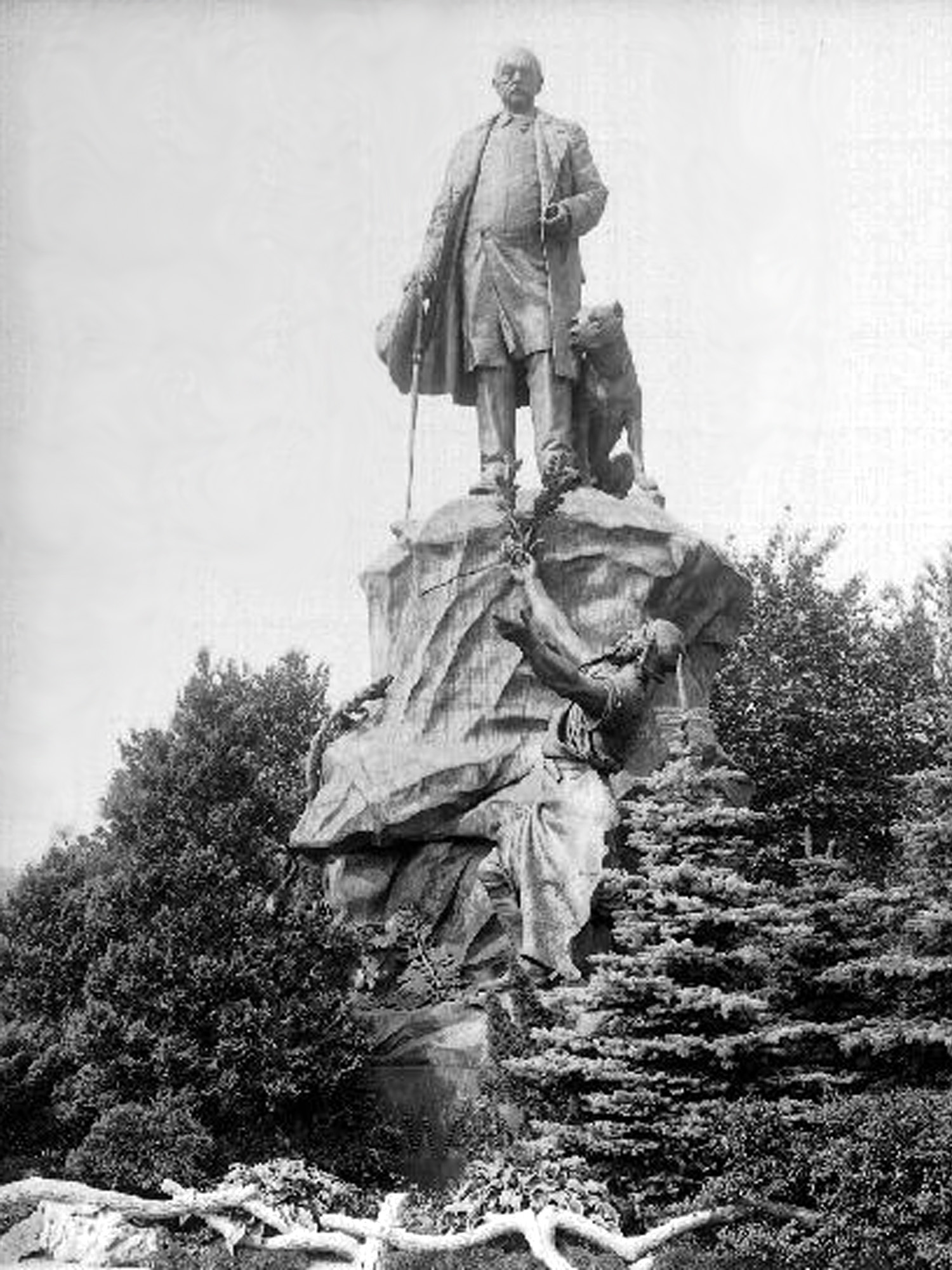
Bismarck Memorial Memorial with "Reichshund" Tyras II, by Adolf Lehnert and Josef Mágr, in the Johanna Park in Leipzig (destroyed 1946)

=== Artistic output ===
Adolf Lehnert was one of the leading exponents of Historicism in Leipzig. He undertook many public and private commissions, and his output is thereby well recorded. In his home city he was involved in providing decorative art work for Leipzig's New (in 1905) City Hall. He worked on the University Library, the nearby German Book Repository and the striking Jugendstil Arts Palace ("Künstlerhaus").

Leipzig was a well heeled city, and Lehnert also received plenty of work on villa decorations and memorials. His work included elaborate tomb stones, allegorical figures, elaborate friezes and busts, along with reliefs and small sculptures. He was in particular demand as a Portraitist and medal designer. His approach built on the idealistic style of his teacher, Melchior, but with ever more precise individualisation. In that respect he can be seen as the founder of a Leipzig portrait art tradition.

Lehnert designed a series of very appealing angel figures, approximately 135 cm high, for the Württemberg Metalwares Factory (then, as now, best known as a cutlery manufacturer). These were cast in Electroformed metal and can still be found in German cemeteries and former cemeteries. They were available "with or without wings", identified in the company's catalogue as "Grave statuette No.745 by Lehnert". There is also one of these angels at the Grave Art Museum in Kassel.

From 1912 he lived and worked in a villa, with its own studio attached, in Markkleeberg which had been built according to his own plans. Later he moved again to a villa in Stötteritz where he passed his final years.

Many of Leinhart's works, cast in copper or bronze, were melted down during the first and second world wars in response to materials shortages.

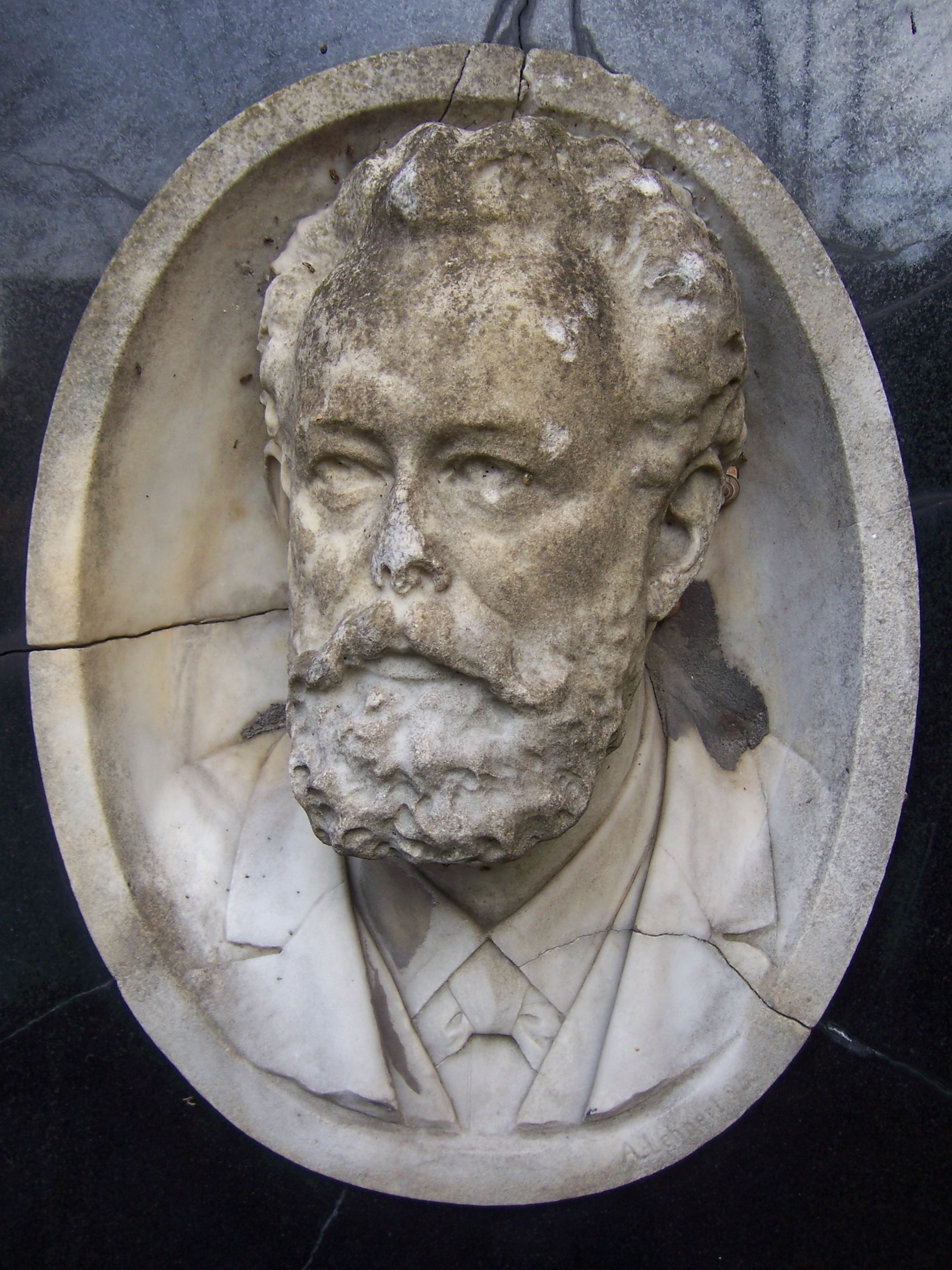
Portraitmedaillon Joh. Carl Gustav Herrmann, Marmor, 1895

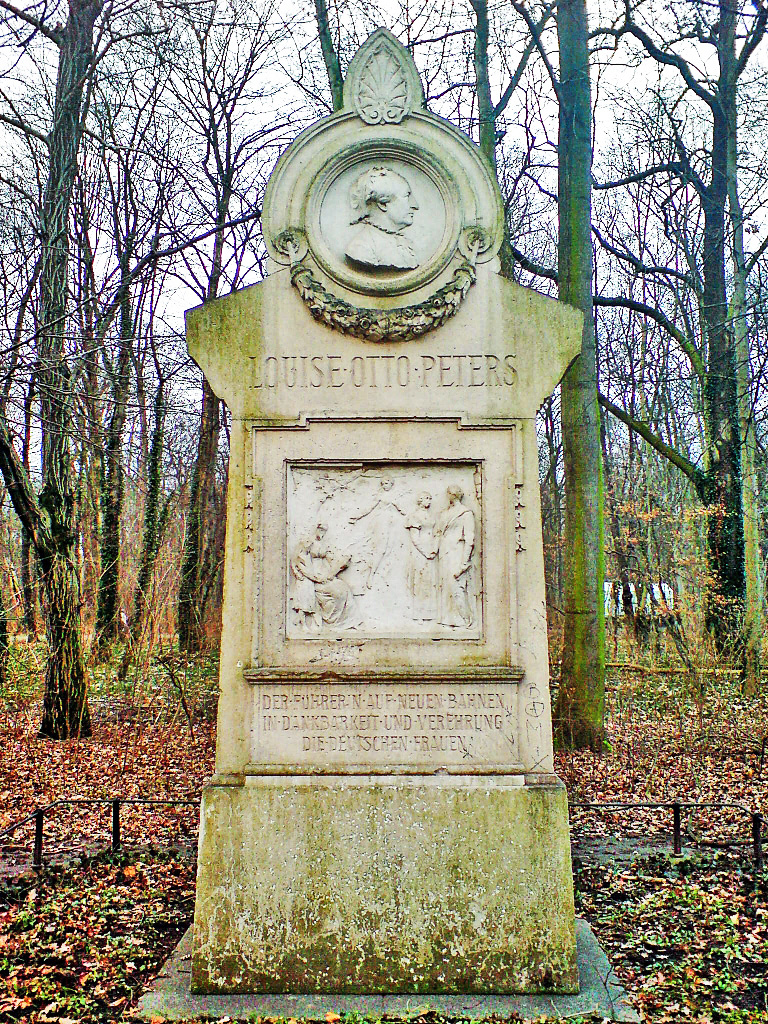
Denkmal für Louise Otto-Peters im Leipziger Rosental

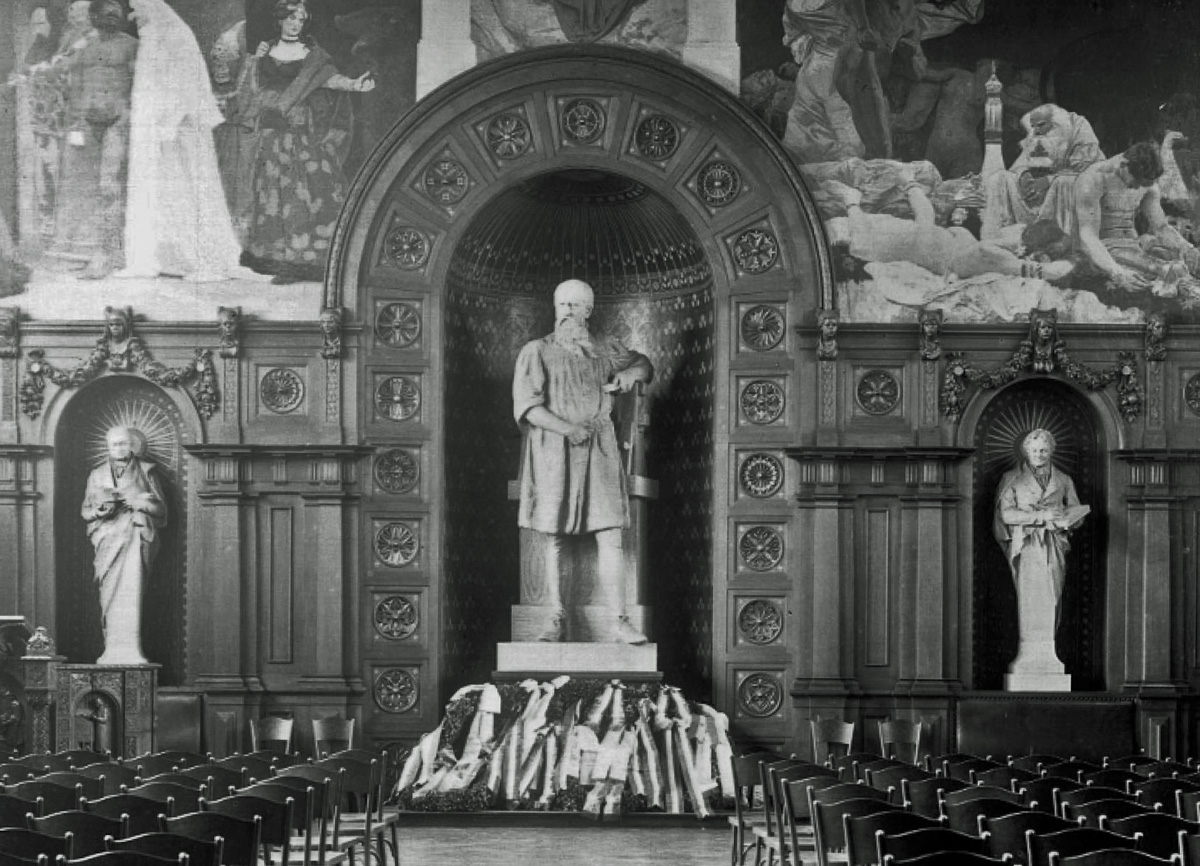
Gutenbergdenkmal im Deutschen Buchgewerbehaus, 1900

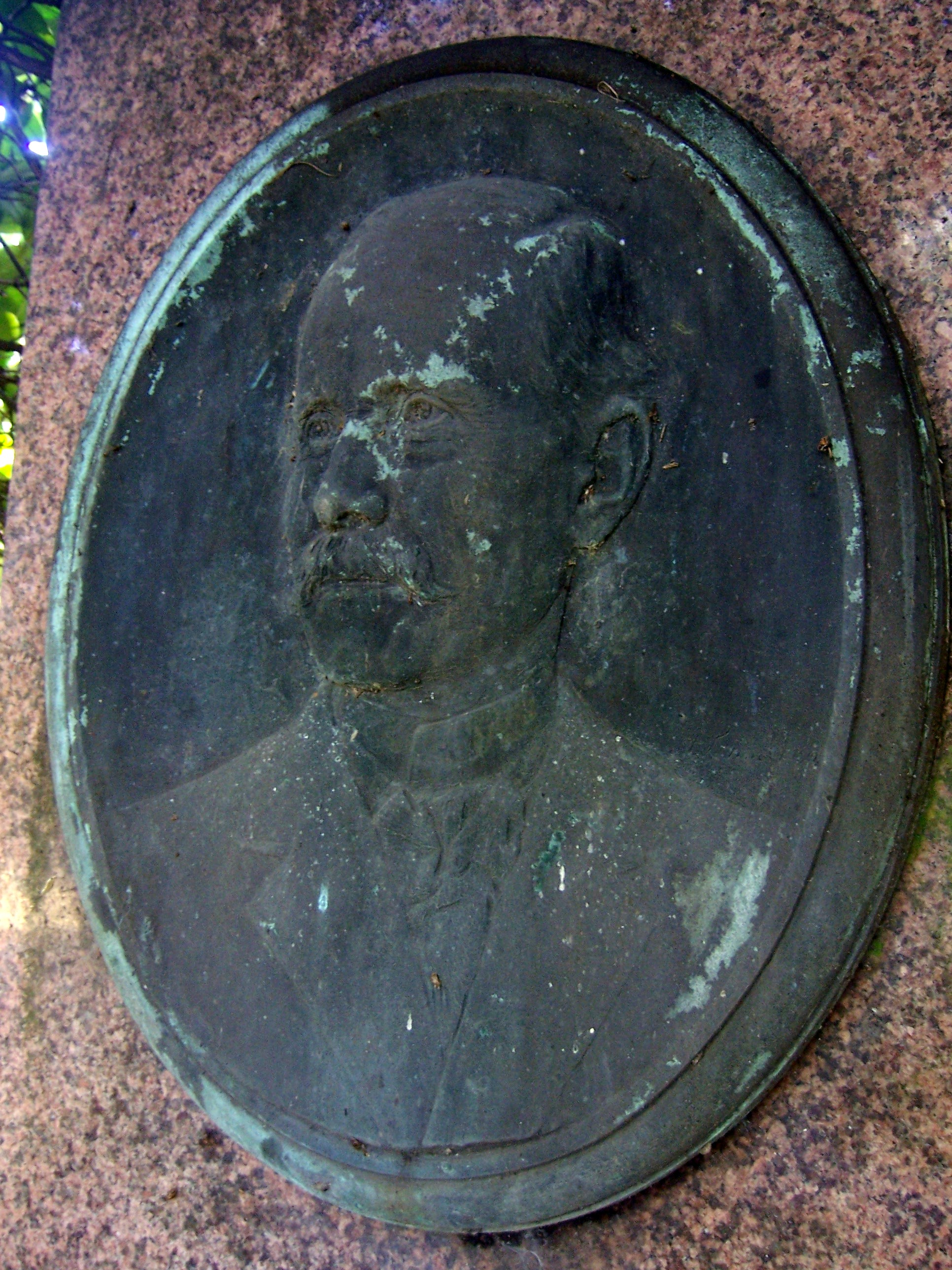
Porträtmedaillon Grabstätte Louis Kuhne, Südfriedhof Leipzig, 1901

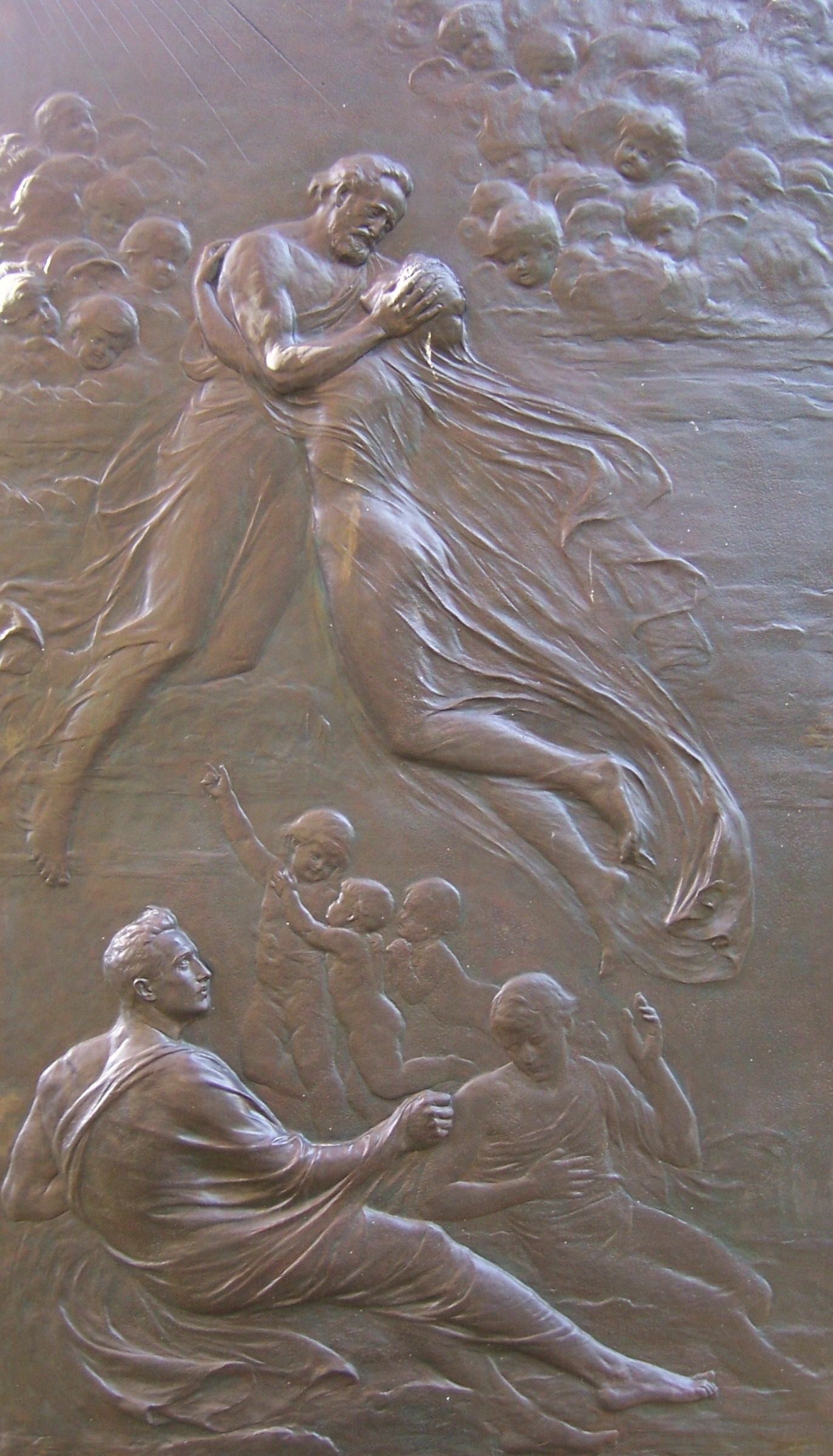
Bronzerelief 1, Grabmal Karl Krause, Neuer Johannisfriedhof, 1902

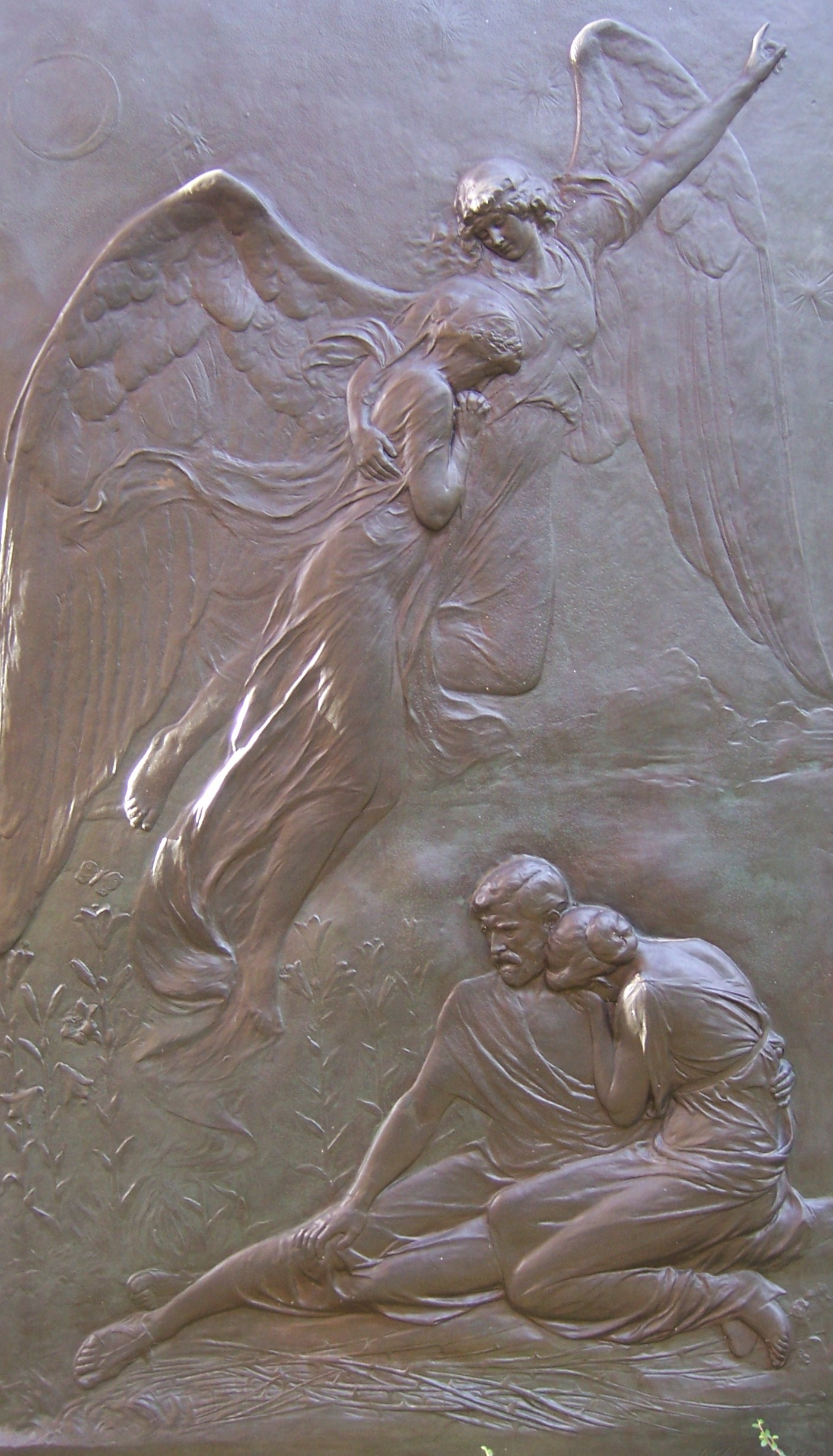
Bronzerelief 2, Grabmal Karl Krause, Neuer Johannisfriedhof, 1902

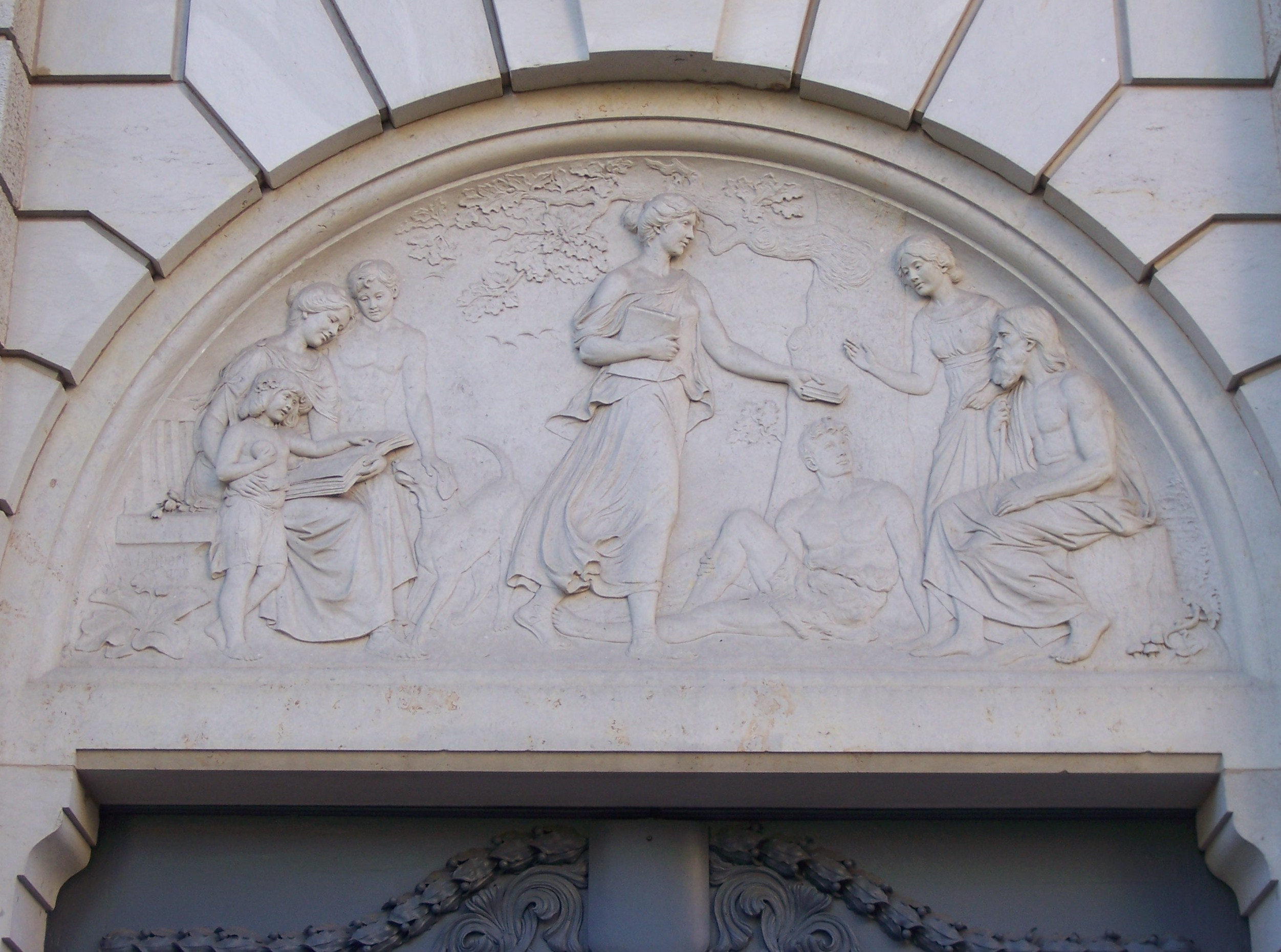
Relief über dem Haupteingang des Reclam-Verlagsgebäudes, 1905

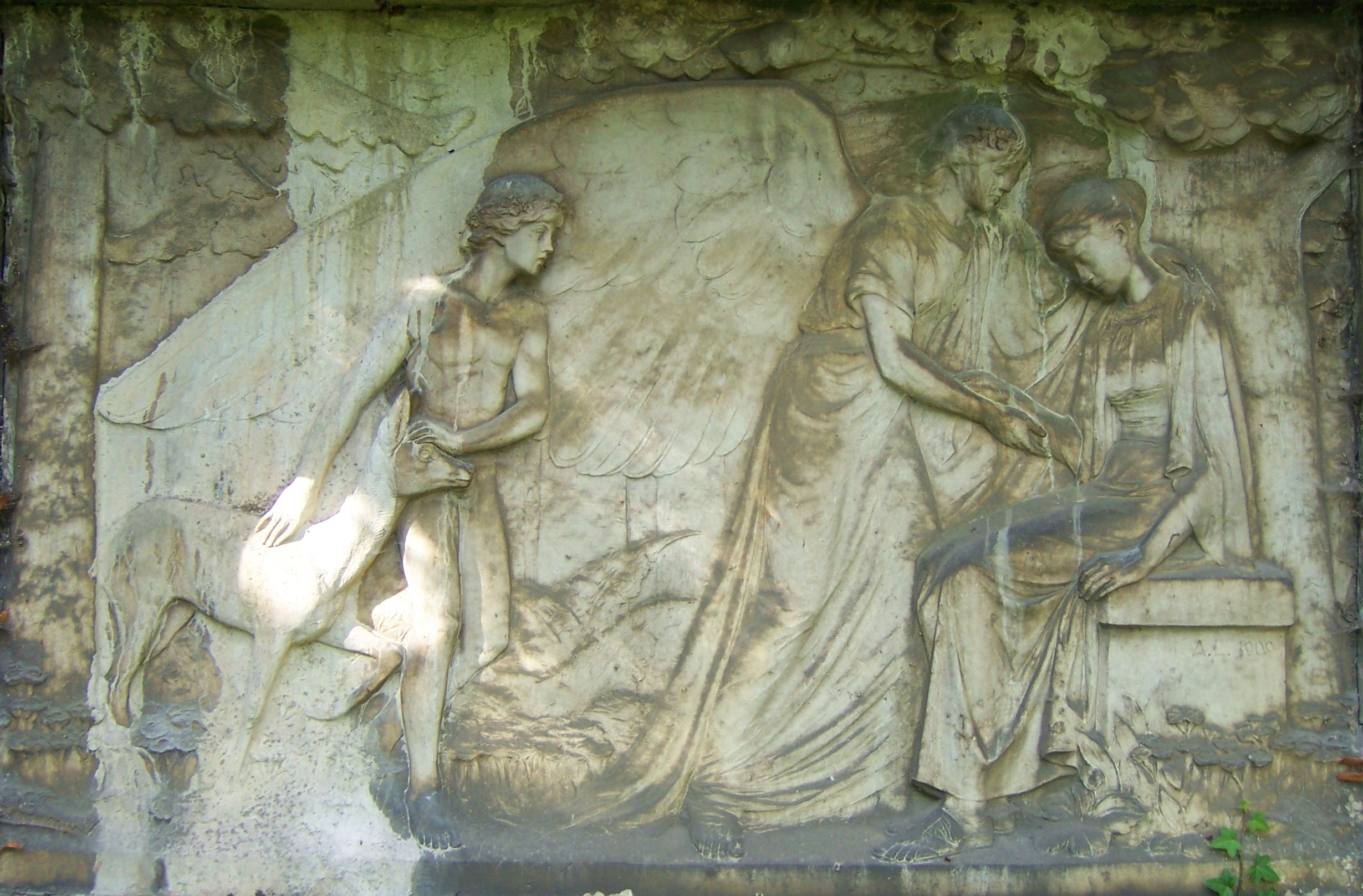
Marmorrelief für seine verstorbene Frau Elsbeth, geb. Riedel, 1907

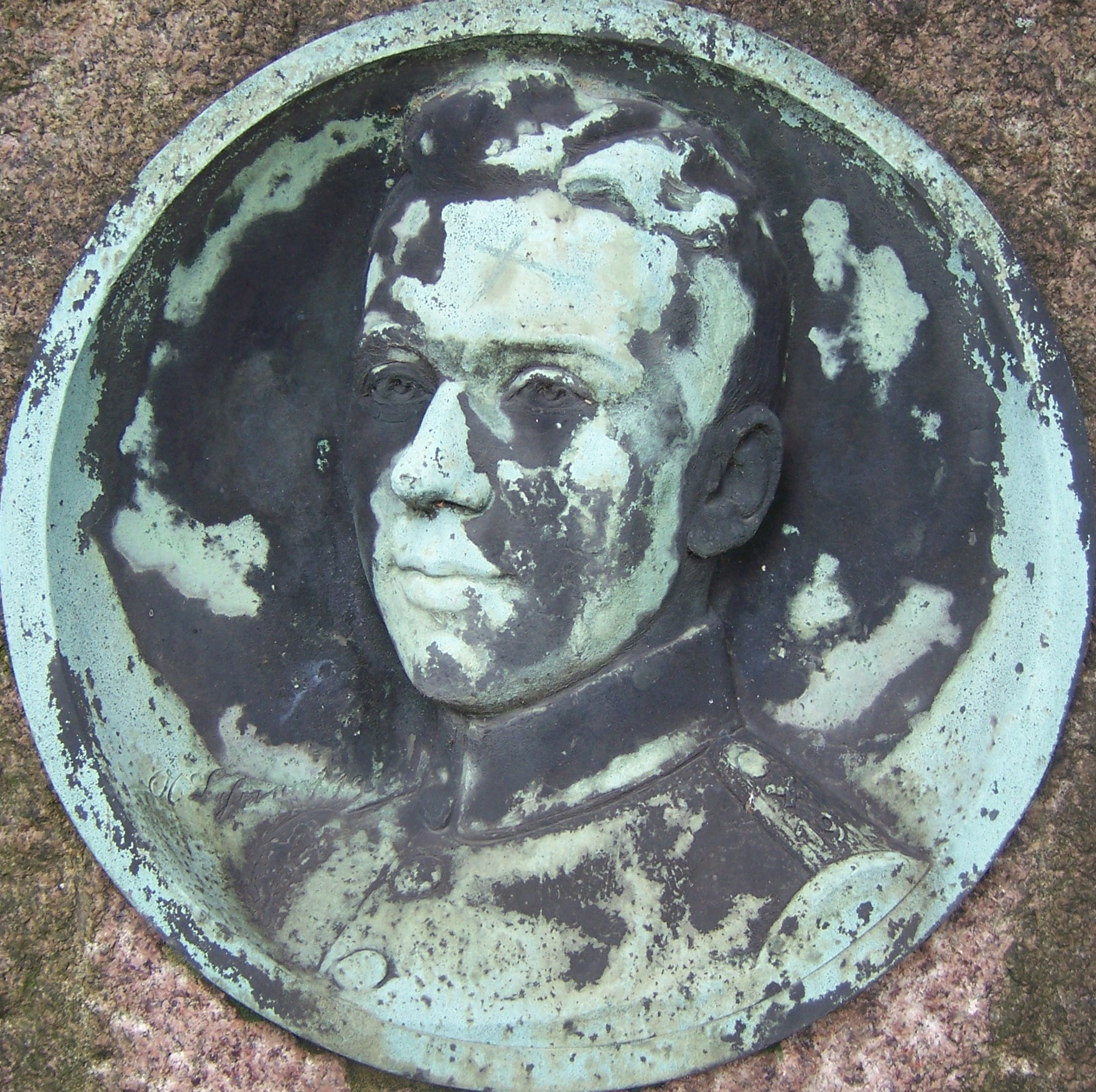
Porträtmedaillon Grabstätte Lange-Lorenz, Südfriedhof Leipzig, 1915

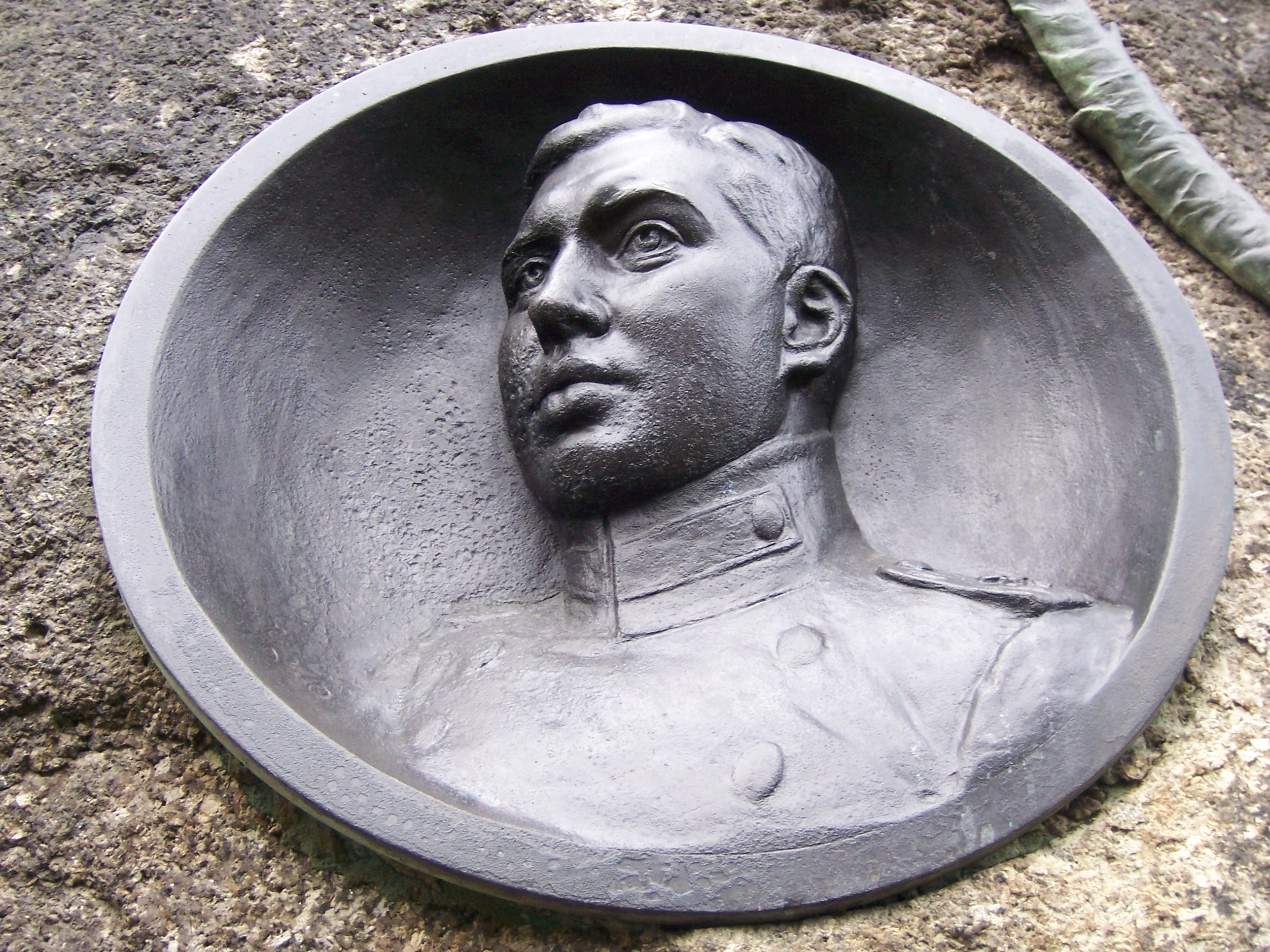
Porträtmedaillon Grabstätte Dr. Ludwig Schwabe, Südfriedhof Leipzig, 1916

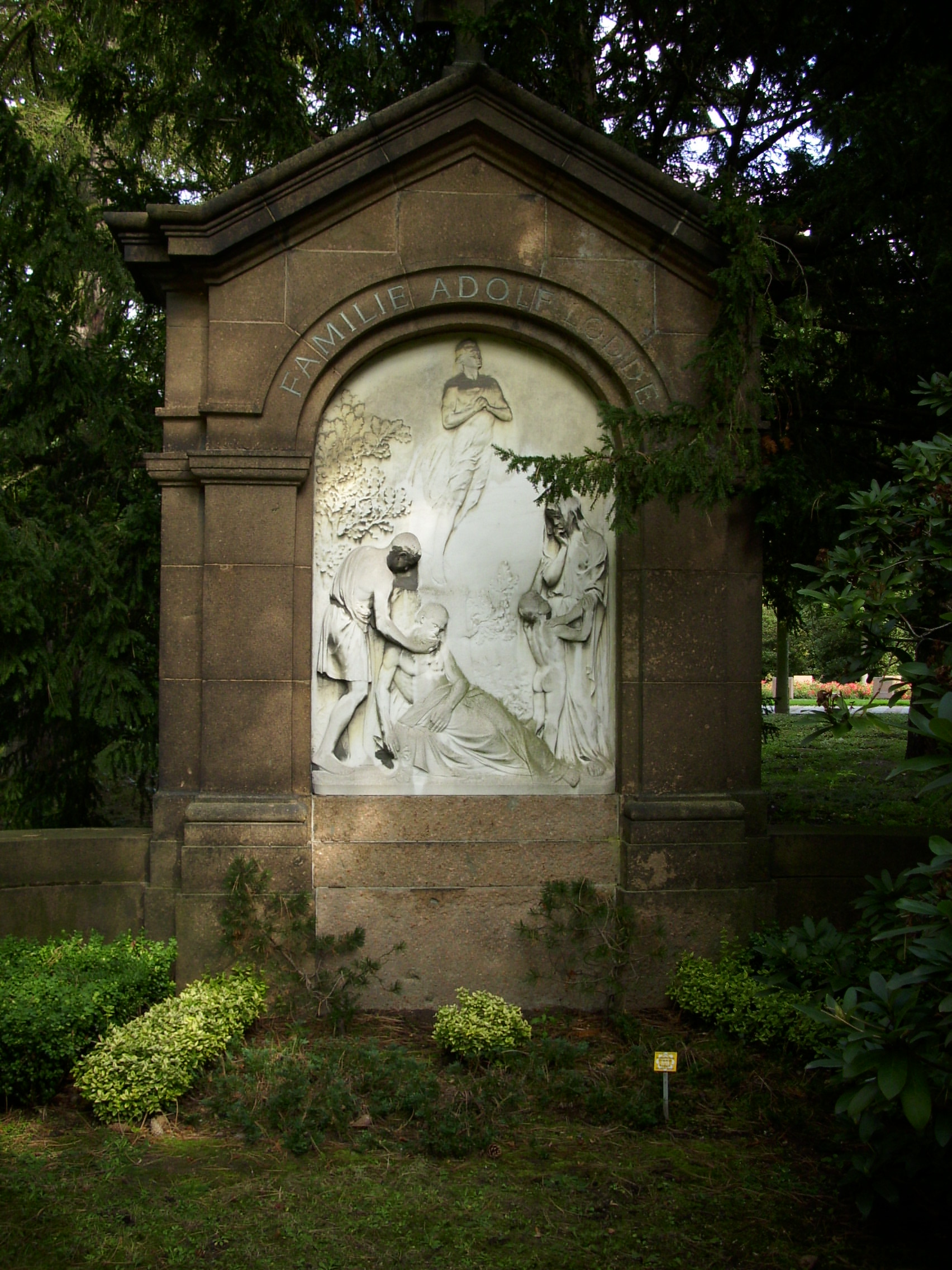
Marmorrelief Grabstätte Alfred Lodde, Südfriedhof Leipzig, 1917

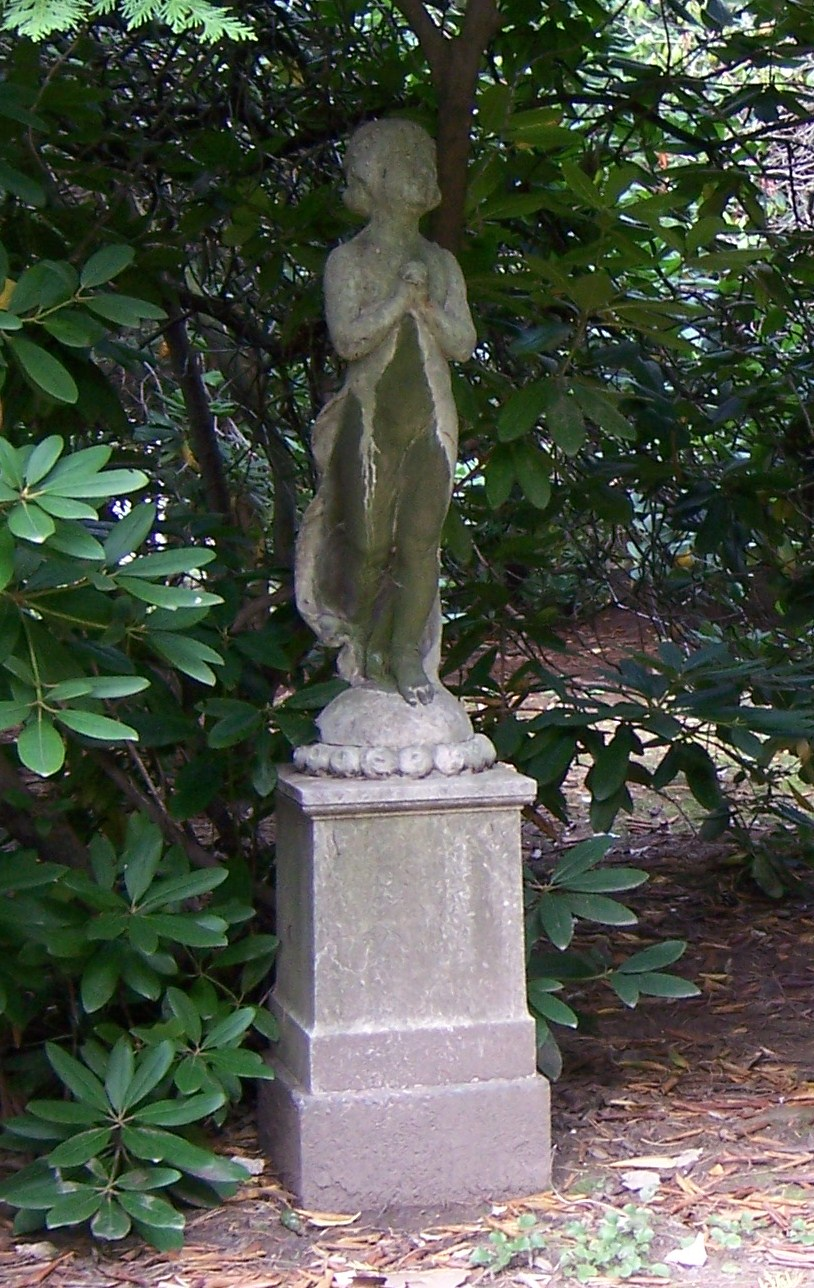
Marmorfigur Grabmal Otto Harrassowitz, Südfriedhof Leipzig, 1920

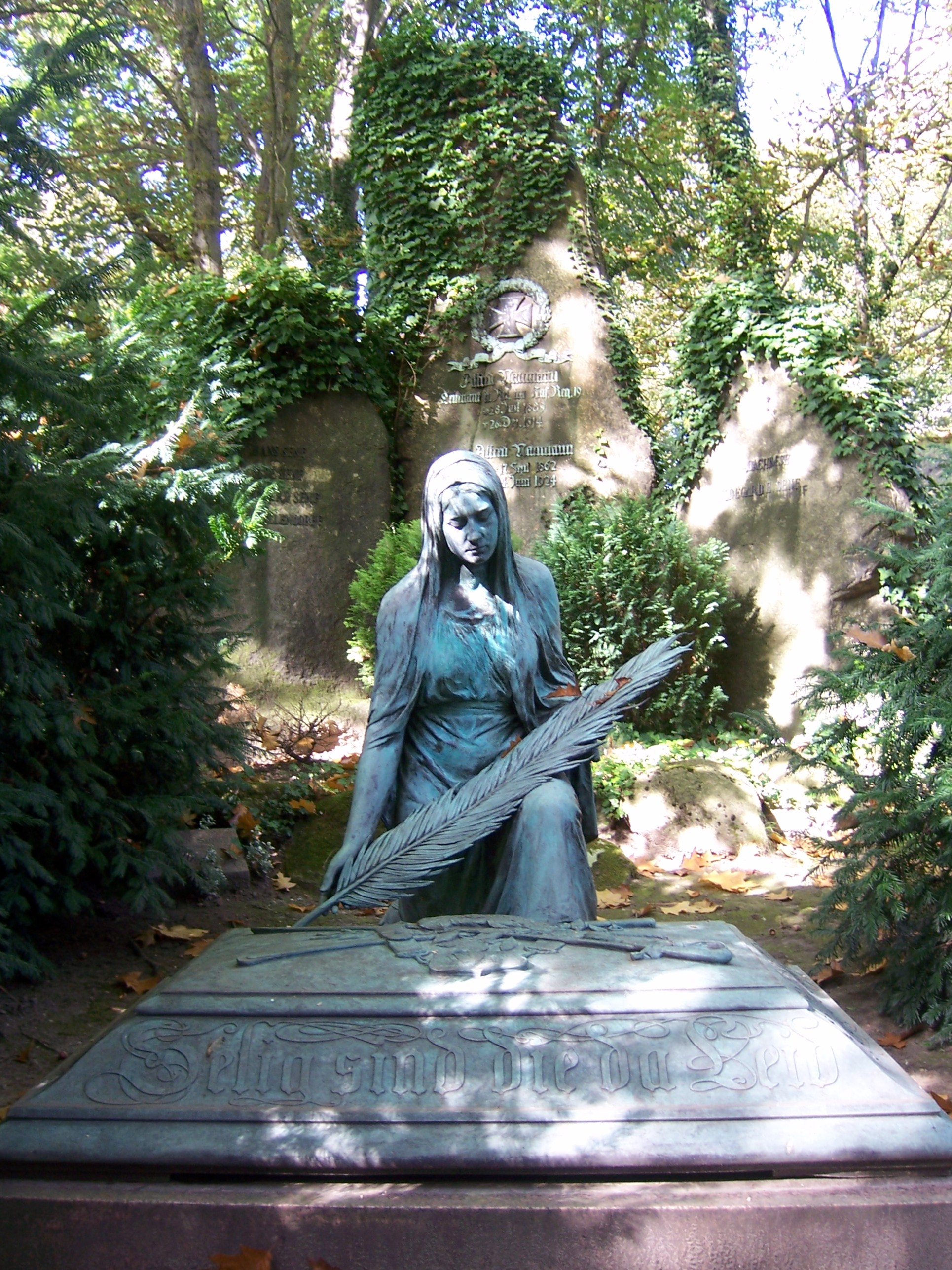
Trauernde mit Siegespalme, Grabmal Naumann, Südfriedhof Leipzig, 1920

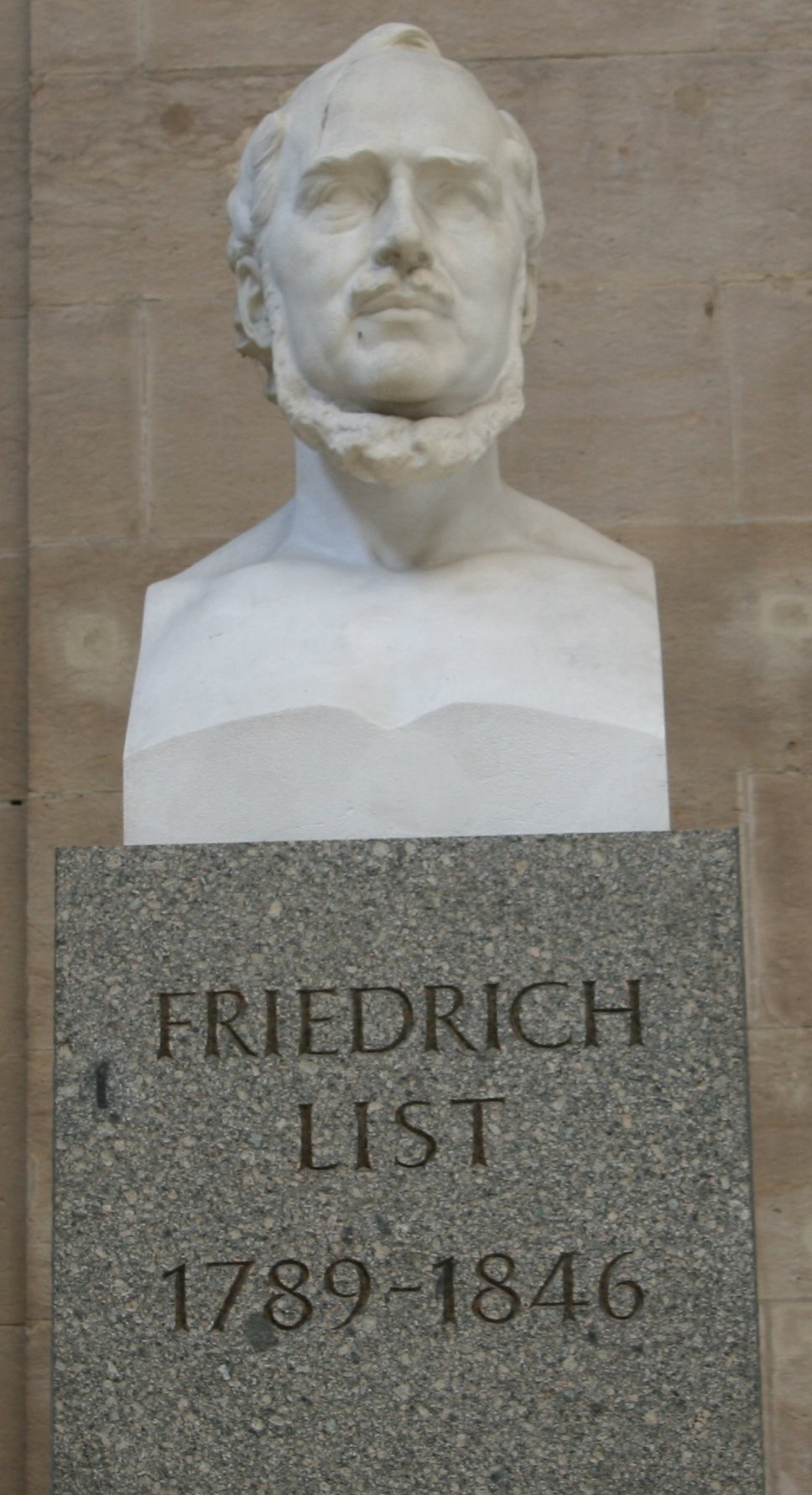
Friedrich-List-Statue am Westausgang des Hauptbahnhofs Leipzig, 1927

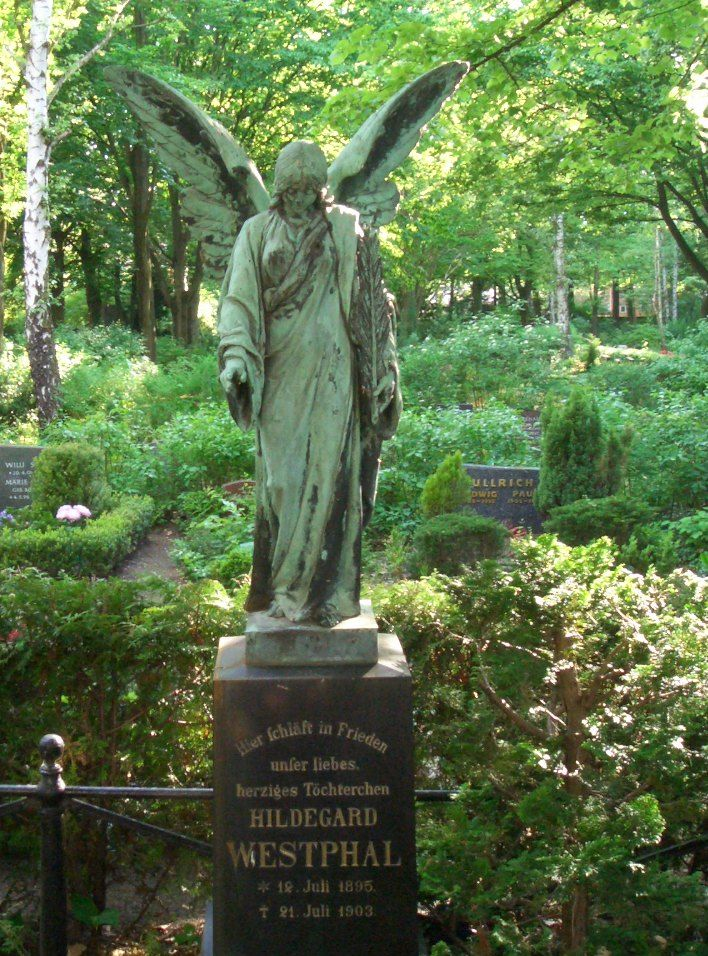
Grabengel (Galvanoplastik) nach einem Modell von Adolf Lehnert

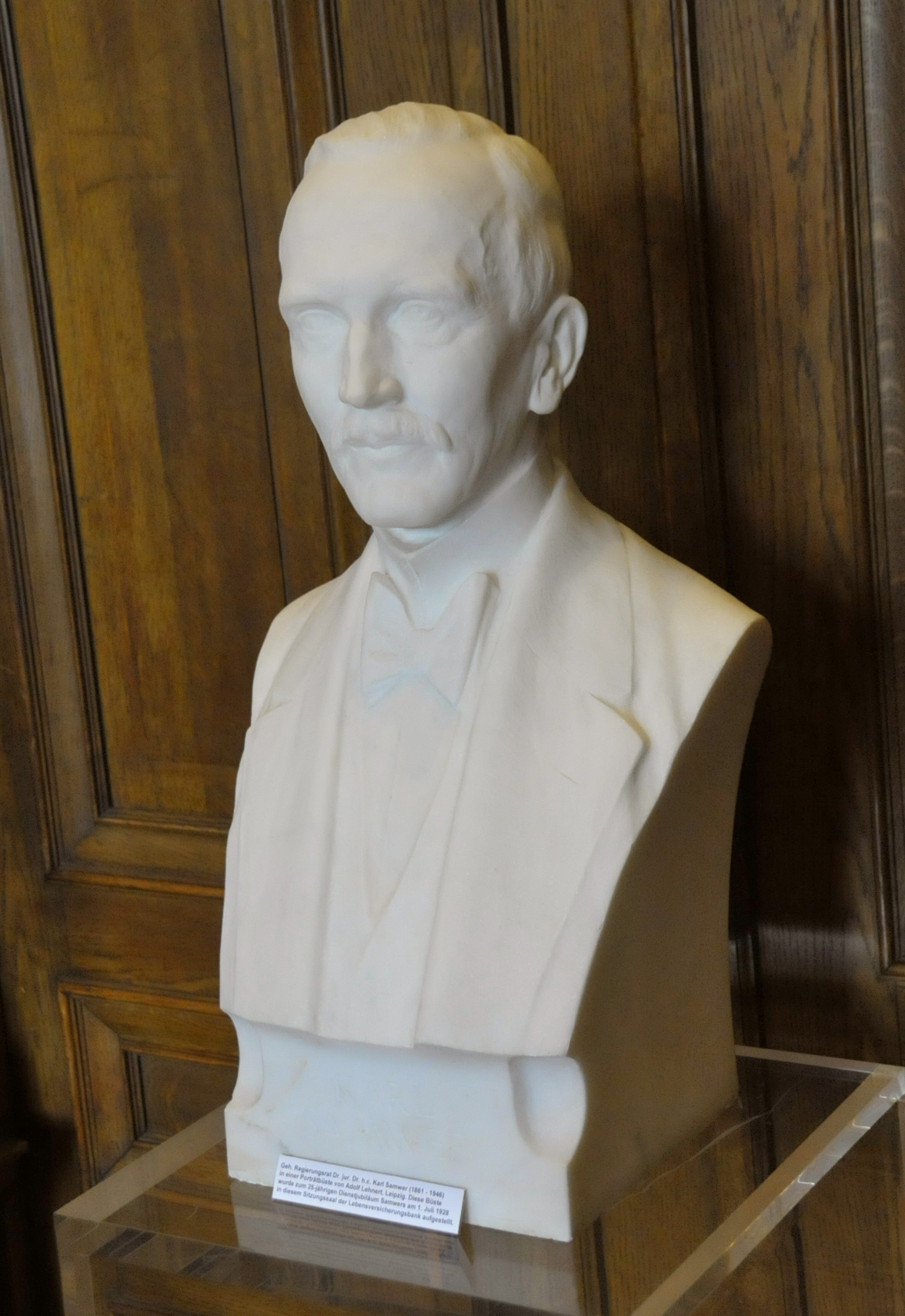
Marmorbüste Karl Samwer, 1928

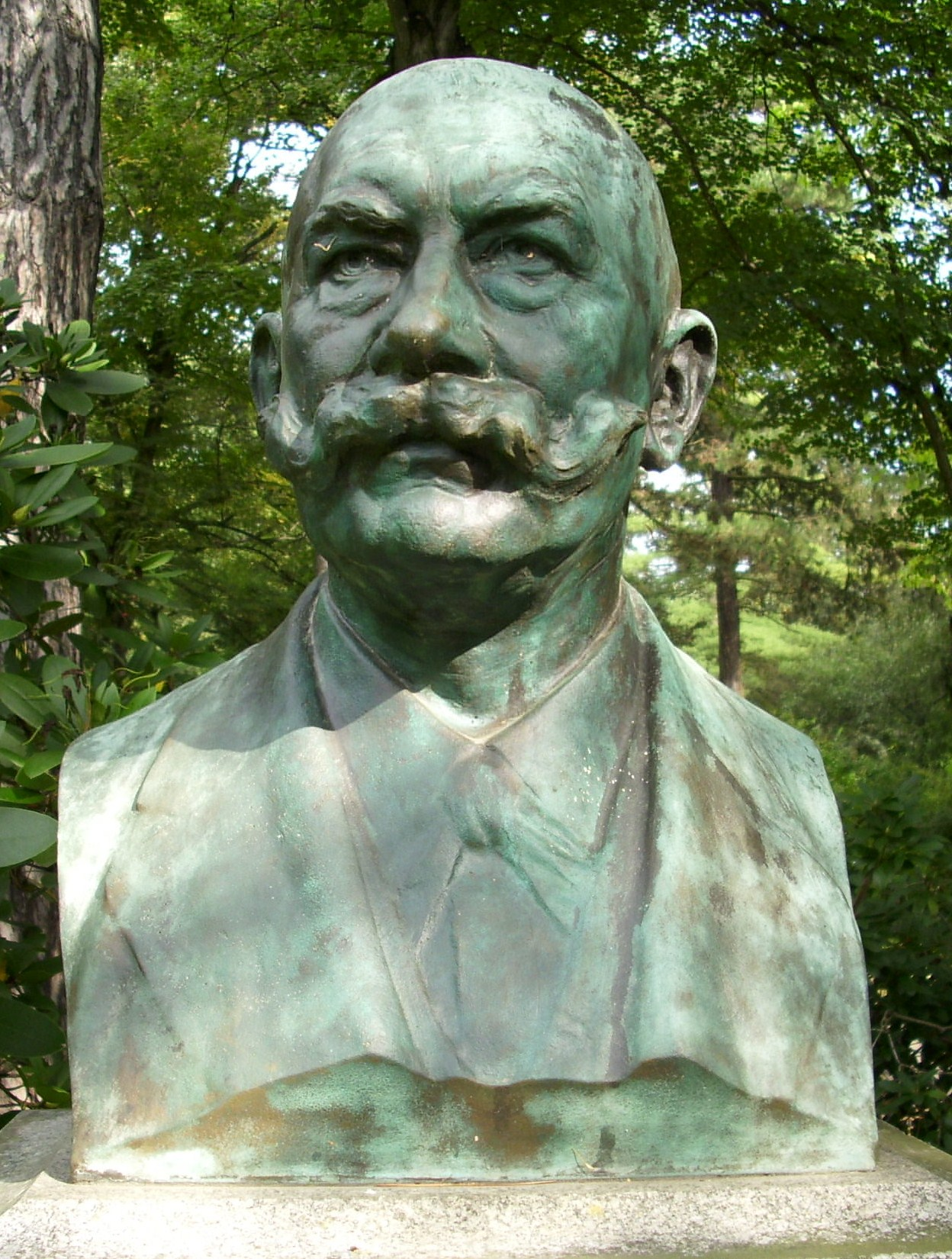
Bronzebüste Georg Grimpe, Südfriedhof Leipzig, 1928

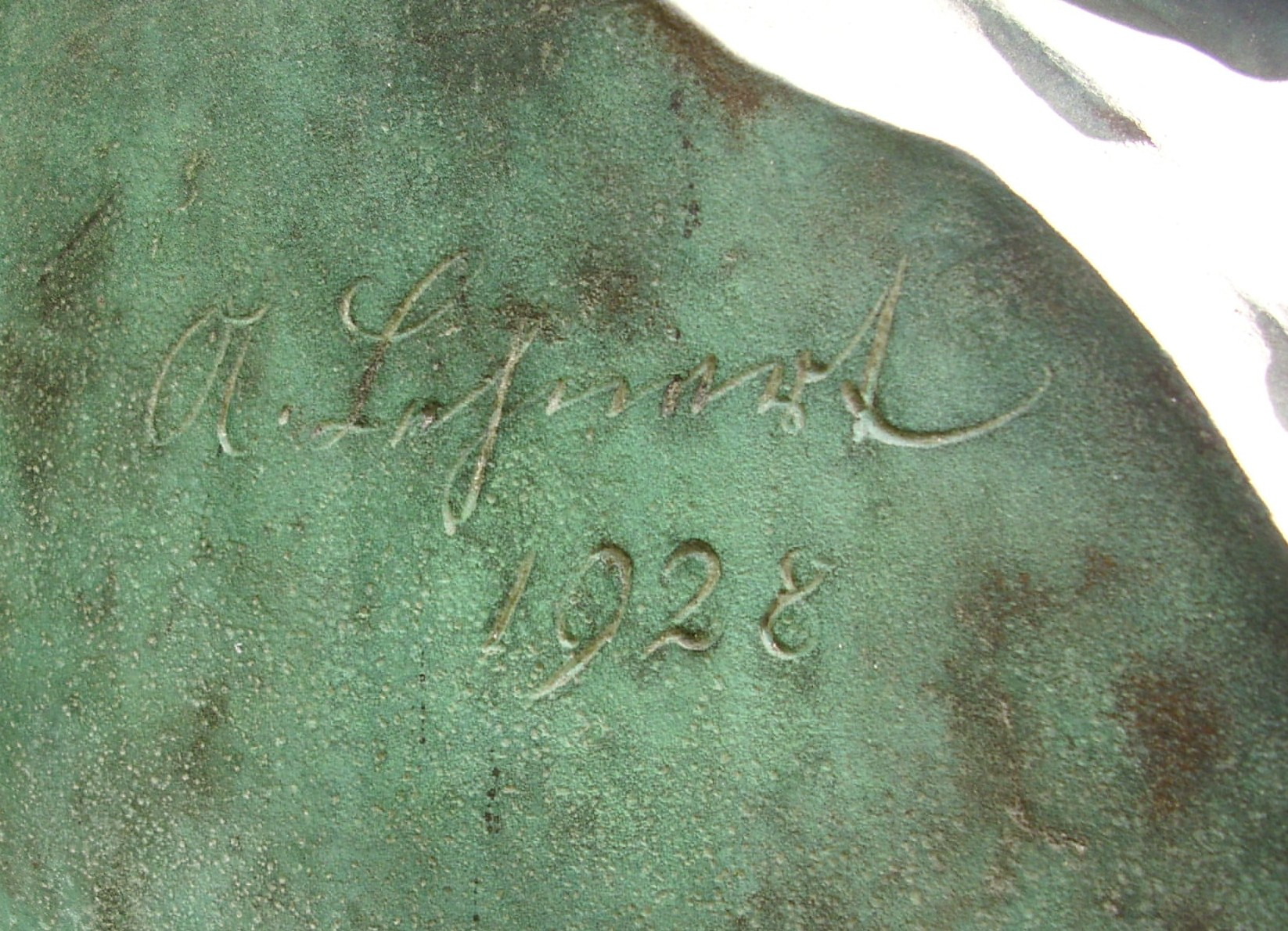
Signatur Adolf Lehnert, Bronzebüste Georg Grimpe
