= List of tallest buildings in Leipzig =

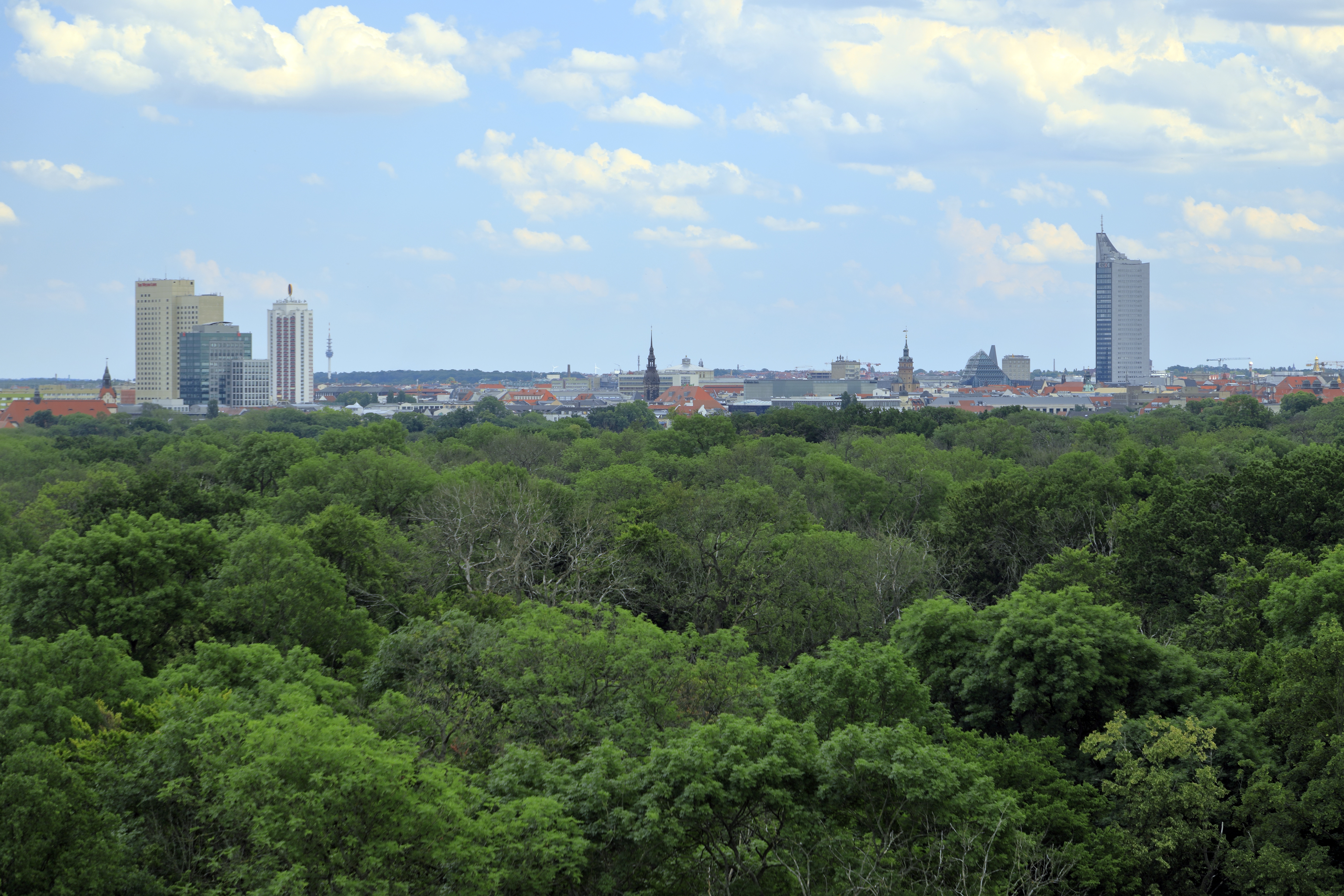
Leipzig's tallest skyscrapers: from left to right – The Westin Leipzig (96 m), Löhrs Carré (65 m), Wintergartenhochhaus (96 m) and City-Hochhaus (142.5 m)

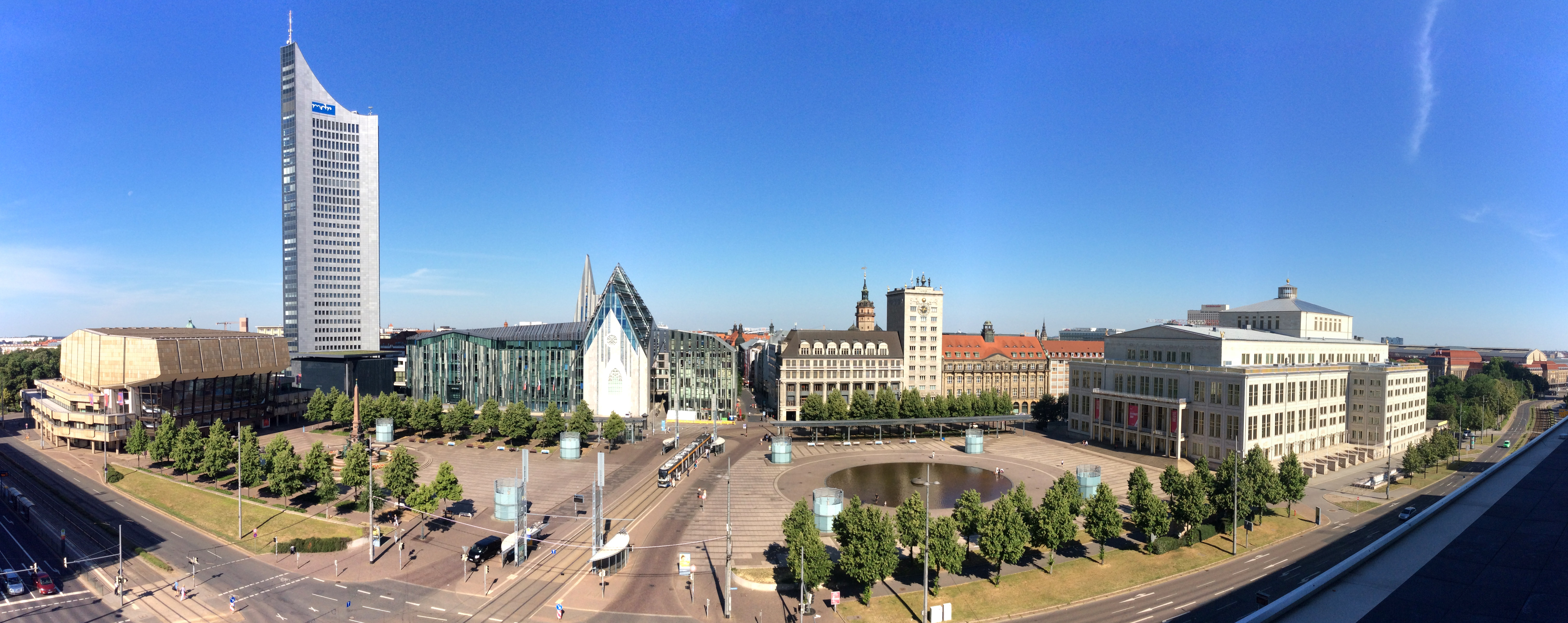
Augustusplatz in Leipzig (Germany): from left to right – Gewandhaus (Concert hall), City-Hochhaus, Augusteum & Paulinum (University), Kroch-Hochhaus, Opera

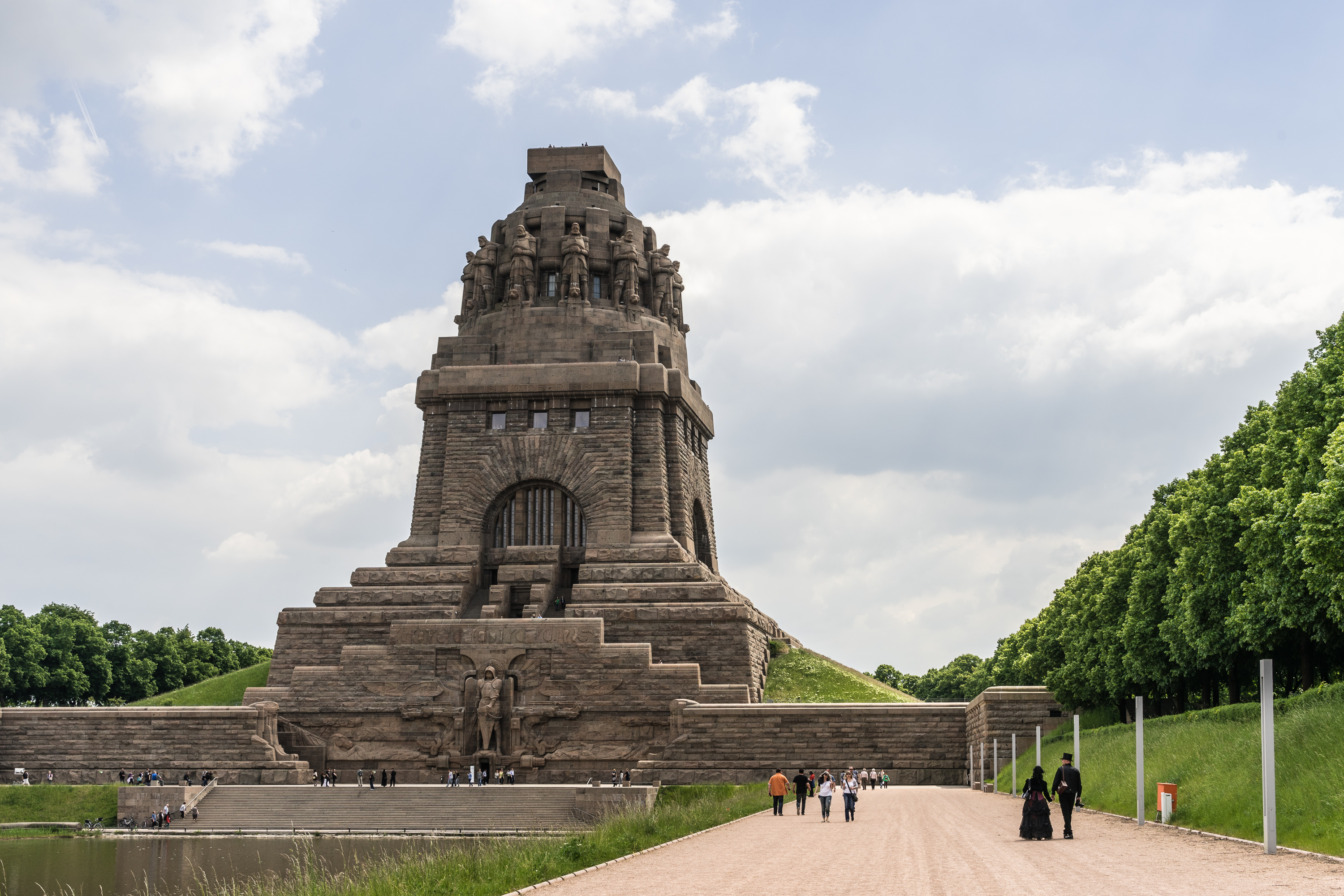
Monument to the Battle of the Nations (91 m), tallest monument in Europe

This list of tallest buildings in Leipzig ranks high-rise buildings and important landmarks that reach a height of 40 metres (131 ft). Only habitable buildings and a book magazine are ranked, which excludes radio masts and towers, observation towers, steeples, chimneys and other tall architectural structures. With the Kroch High-rise of 1928 and the Europahaus of 1929 at the Augustusplatz, Leipzig was one of the first high-rise cities in Germany.

Due to the constant strong growth of the number of inhabitants of Leipzig, after many years of stagnation and demolition, the focus is again on the construction of high-rise buildings. The new development of Wilhelm-Leuschner-Platz includes a high-rise building on its north-eastern corner next to Roßplatz, which is currently planned to be 55.5 metres (182 ft) tall. The site of the former Eutritzscher Freiladebahnhof north of Leipzig's main train station is to be redeveloped over an area of 25 hectares (62 acres). Among other things, 3,700 apartments as well as commercial and office space are to be built. In addition to two 10-storey high points at the edges, there will be a city park in the middle, which will be framed by three 16-storey high-rise buildings

In 2020, Henn Architekten from Munich won the architectural competition for two high-rise buildings to be built between the Westin Hotel and the banks of the Parthe River with 17 stories (approx. 65 m) and 13 stories (approx. 50 m).

To the west of the main train station between Kurt-Schumacher-Straße and Berliner Straße, the new Löwitz Quarter is being built with rental and owner-occupied apartments, a hotel, offices, restaurants and retail outlets as well as a secondary school and kindergarten. Furthermore, a 60-metre high-rise office building is planned in the northern part of the quarter (Baufeld 9).

The "Hochhaus Semmelweisstraße" by KLM-Architekten is an newly planned 18 storey residential building on the former site of a data center on October 18 Street. Construction is scheduled to begin by the end of 2023.

For a limited time, the Bundesland of Saxony is funding high-rise timber building projects under the keyword "experimental construction". In this context, Saxony's first wooden high-rise is to be built in Leipzig-Paunsdorf on Heiterblickallee. The owner is the housing cooperative Wohnungsbaugenossenschaft Kontakt.

The high-rise development on the Goerdelerring, on the other hand, will take some time to come. The city of Leipzig has set itself the goal of determining the course of the opening of the underground waterway named Pleißemühlegraben in this area. Only then will it be clear whether the high-rise will be built next to or above the uncovered waterway, which will have a significant impact on the planning and architecture of the building.

== Tallest buildings ==
Rank	Image	Name	Location	Use	Opening	Height (m / ft)	Floors	architects
		Funkturm Leipzig	Zentrum-Südost, Leipzig-Mitte	Television tower	2015	191 metres (627 ft)		
1.	more pictures	City-Hochhaus Leipzig tallest building in Germany from 1972 to 1973,	Augustusplatz, Leipzig-Mitte	Offices, restaurant, viewing platform	1972	142.5 metres (468 ft)	36	Hermann Henselmann
		Fernmeldeturm Leipzig	Holzhausen, Leipzig-Südost	Telecommunication tower	1995	132 metres (433 ft)		
		New Town Hall tallest city hall tower in Germany	Zentrum, Leipzig-Mitte	City Hall	1905	114.8 metres (377 ft)		Hugo Licht
2.	more pictures	Hotel The Westin Leipzig	Zentrum Nord, Leipzig-Mitte	Hotel	1981	96 metres (315 ft)	27	Kajima architects, Tokio
3.	more pictures	Wintergartenhochhaus,	next to Hauptbahnhof	Apartments	1972	95.5 metres (313 ft)	32	Collective led by Frieder Gebhardt
		Monument to the Battle of the Nations tallest monument in Europe	Probstheida, Südost	Monument	1913	91 metres (299 ft)		Bruno Schmitz
		Old St. Peter's Church tallest church tower in Leipzig	Zentrum-Süd, Leipzig-Mitte		1885	88.5 metres (290 ft)		August Hartel und Constantin Lipsius
		Heilandskirche	Plagwitz, Südwest		1888	86 metres (282 ft)		Johannes Otzen
		Messeturm Leipzig (Leipzig Trade Fair Tower)	Seehausen, Leipzig-Nord		1995	85 metres (279 ft)		Schlaich Bergermann Partner (Design) & Gerkan, Marg und Partner (Architecture)
		St. Nicholas Church	Zentrum, Leipzig-Mitte		12th century, (tower) 18th century	75 metres (246 ft)		
		Nathanaelkirche	Lindenau, Alt-West		1884	74.25 metres (244 ft)		August Hartel and Constantin Lipsius.
		Federal Administrative Court (Bundesverwaltungsgericht)	Zentrum Süd, Leipzig-Mitte	Supreme court	1895	74 metres (243 ft)		Ludwig Hoffmann und Peter Dybwad
		St.-Lukas-Church	Volkmarsdorf, Leipzig-Ost		1893	71 metres (233 ft)		Julius Zeißig
		Michaeliskirche	Zentrum Nord, Leipzig-Mitte		1904	70 metres (230 ft)		Heinrich Rust and Alfred Müller
		St. Thomas Church	Zentrum, Leipzig-Mitte		12th century, (tower) 1537	68 metres (223 ft)		
		Heilig-Kreuz-Church	Neustadt-Neuschönefeld, Leipzig-Ost		1894	67.5 metres (221 ft)		Paul Lange
		Reformierte Kirche	Zentrum, Leipzig-Mitte		1893	67 metres (220 ft)		Georg Weidenbach and Richard Tschammer
		Emmauskirche	Sellerhausen, Leipzig-Ost		1894	66 metres (217 ft)		Paul Lange
		Lutherkirche	Bachviertel, Zentrum-West		1884	65 metres (213 ft)		Julius Zeißig
4.	more pictures	MDR-Hochhaus	Südvorstadt	Mitteldeutscher Rundfunk	2000	65 metres (213 ft)	13	Architectural group Gondesen Plachnow Staack (GPS) with Struhk & Partner
5.	more pictures	High rise Löhrs Carré,	Zentrum Nord, Leipzig-Mitte	Offices	1997	65 metres (213 ft)	17	Wörle-Siebig Planungsgesellschaft, München
6.		Center Torgauer Platz,	Volkmarsdorf	Offices	1995	63 metres (207 ft)	12	HPP Architekten with Gerd Heise
		Philippus-Church	Lindenau, Alt-West		1910	62.5 metres (205 ft)		Alfred Müller
		Paul-Gerhardt-Church	Connewitz, Leipzig-Süd		1900	60 metres (197 ft)		Julius Zeißig
7.	more pictures	Europahaus,	Augustusplatz, Leipzig-Mitte	Offices	1929	56 metres (184 ft)	13	Otto Paul Burghardt
8.		Magazine Tower of German National Library	Zentrum Süd-Ost, Leipzig Mitte	Book magazine	1982	55 metres (180 ft)	18	Dieter Seidlitz, Dresden
		St. Alexi Memorial Church	Zentrum Süd-Ost, Leipzig Mitte		1912/13	55 metres (180 ft)		Wladimir Alexandrowitsch Pokrowski
		Taborkirche	Kleinzschocher, Südwest		1904	52 metres (171 ft)		Arwed Roßbach & Richard Lucht
9.–35.	more pictures	still 27 high-rise buildings of the PH 16 series of residential buildings PH 16	Leipzig-Grünau (5 of the original 19 preserved) Leipzig-Schönefeld (5 of the original 8 preserved), Leipzig-Mockau (4 of the original 7 preserved), Musikviertel (all 3 preserved), Leipzig-Marienbrunn (both preserved), Straße des 18. Oktober (all 8 preserved)	apartments	1974–1988	50.5 metres (166 ft)	16	
		Gedächtniskirche Schönefeld	Schönefeld, Nordost		1820	50 metres (164 ft)		Walter Friedrich
		Friedenskirche	Gohlis, Leipzig-Nord		1873	~50 metres (164 ft)		Hugo Altendorff
		Propsteikirche St. Trinitatis	Zentrum, Leipzig-Mitte		2015	50 metres (164 ft)		Schulz & Schulz
36.	more pictures	Kroch High-rise, first high-rise building in Leipzig,	Augustusplatz/Goethestraße 2, Leipzig-Mitte	Egyptian museum of the university of Leipzig, Institute	1928	43 metres (141 ft)	12	German Bestelmeyer
37.		Lipsia-Tower	Leipzig-Grünau, Miltitzer Allee 32	Reside	2020	42 metres (138 ft)	13	Fuchshuber & Partner
38.		Former column tower	Wissenschaftspark Leipzig, Permoserstraße 15	Guest apartments (formerly isotope separation columns)	1966	40 metres (131 ft)	11	Schneider and Mothes
39.		Brühlpelz high rise	Leipzig-Mitte, Brühl	Hotel	1966	40 metres (131 ft)	11	Wolfgang Schreiner, Günther Seltz

== See also ==
- List of tallest buildings in Germany
- Architecture of Leipzig

== Literature ==
- Topfstedt, Thomas (1988). Städtebau in der DDR 1955–1971. Leipzig: VEB E. A. Seemann Verlag. ISBN 3-363-00364-1.
- Tesch, Joachim (2003). Bauen in Leipzig 1945-1990. Leipzig: Rosa-Luxemburg-Stiftung Sachsen. ISBN 3-89819-159-1.
- Lütke Daldrup, Engelbert (1999). Leipzig Bauten / Buildings 1989-1999. Basel / Berlin / Boston: Birkhäuser. ISBN 3-7643-5957-9.
- Reuther, I. (2000). Prototyp und Sonderfall Über Hochhäuser in Leipzig. In: Rodenstein, M. (eds) Hochhäuser in Deutschland. Vieweg+Teubner Verlag, Wiesbaden. https://doi.org/10.1007/978-3-322-99951-1_9
- Hocquél, Wolfgang (2004). Leipzig. Architektur. Von der Romanik bis zur Gegenwart. Leipzig: Passage-Verlag. ISBN 3-932900-54-5.
- Leonhardt, Peter (2007). Moderne in Leipzig. Architektur und Städtebau 1918-1933. Leipzig: Pro Leipzig. ISBN 978-3-936508-29-1.
- Ringel, Sebastian (2015). Leipzig! One Thousand Years of History. Leipzig: Author and Edition Leipzig in the Seemann Henschel GmbH & Co. KG. ISBN 978-3-361-00710-9.
