= Selter & Weinert =

Former German fur and skin wholesaler

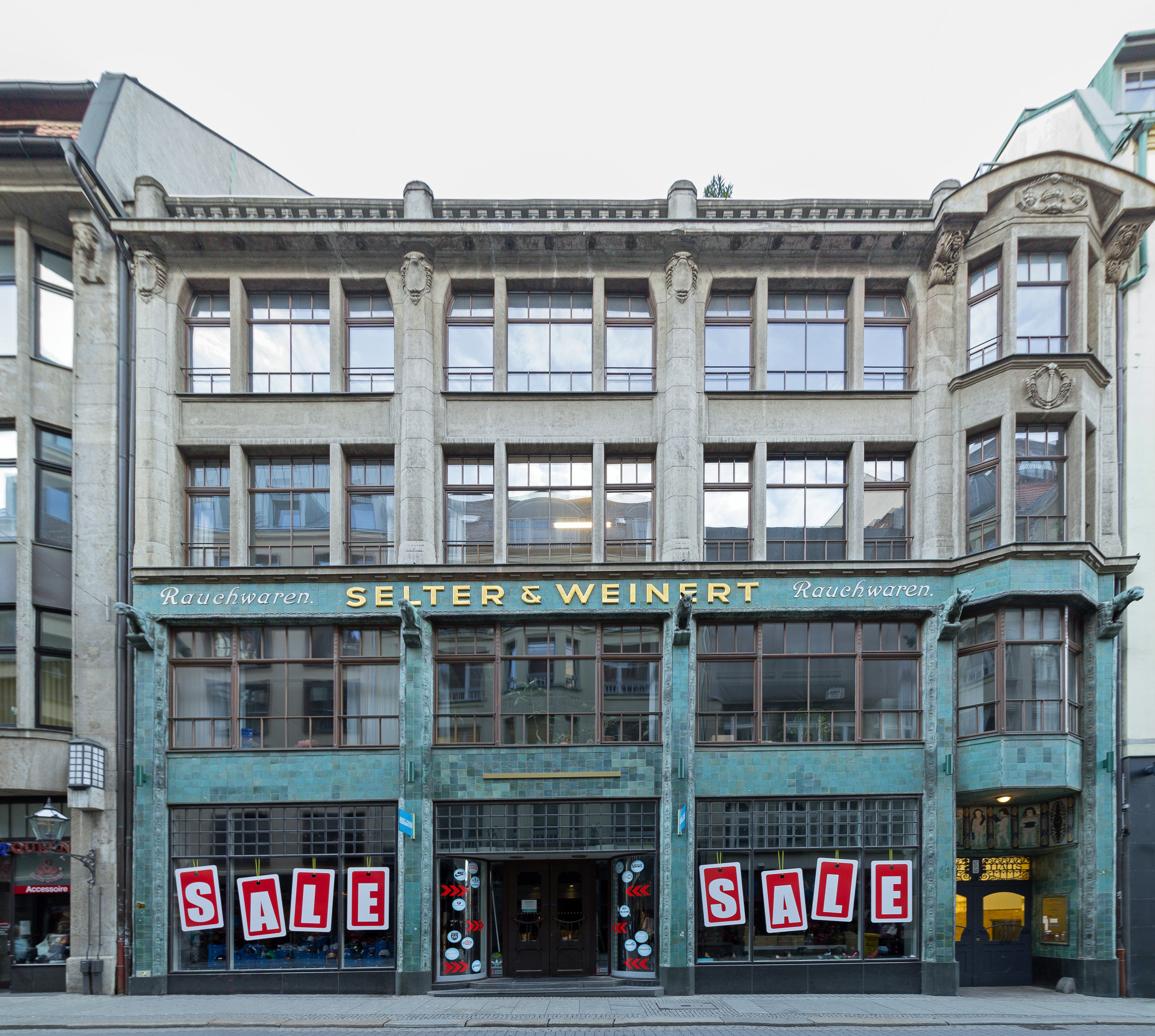
„Selters Haus“, former building Selter & Weinert (2015)

The Selter & Weinert smoke goods wholesale business was founded by Martin Bromberg in Hamburg, who also had a fur trading business in Brühl.

== Corporate history ==
=== M. Bromberg & Co. Successor ===
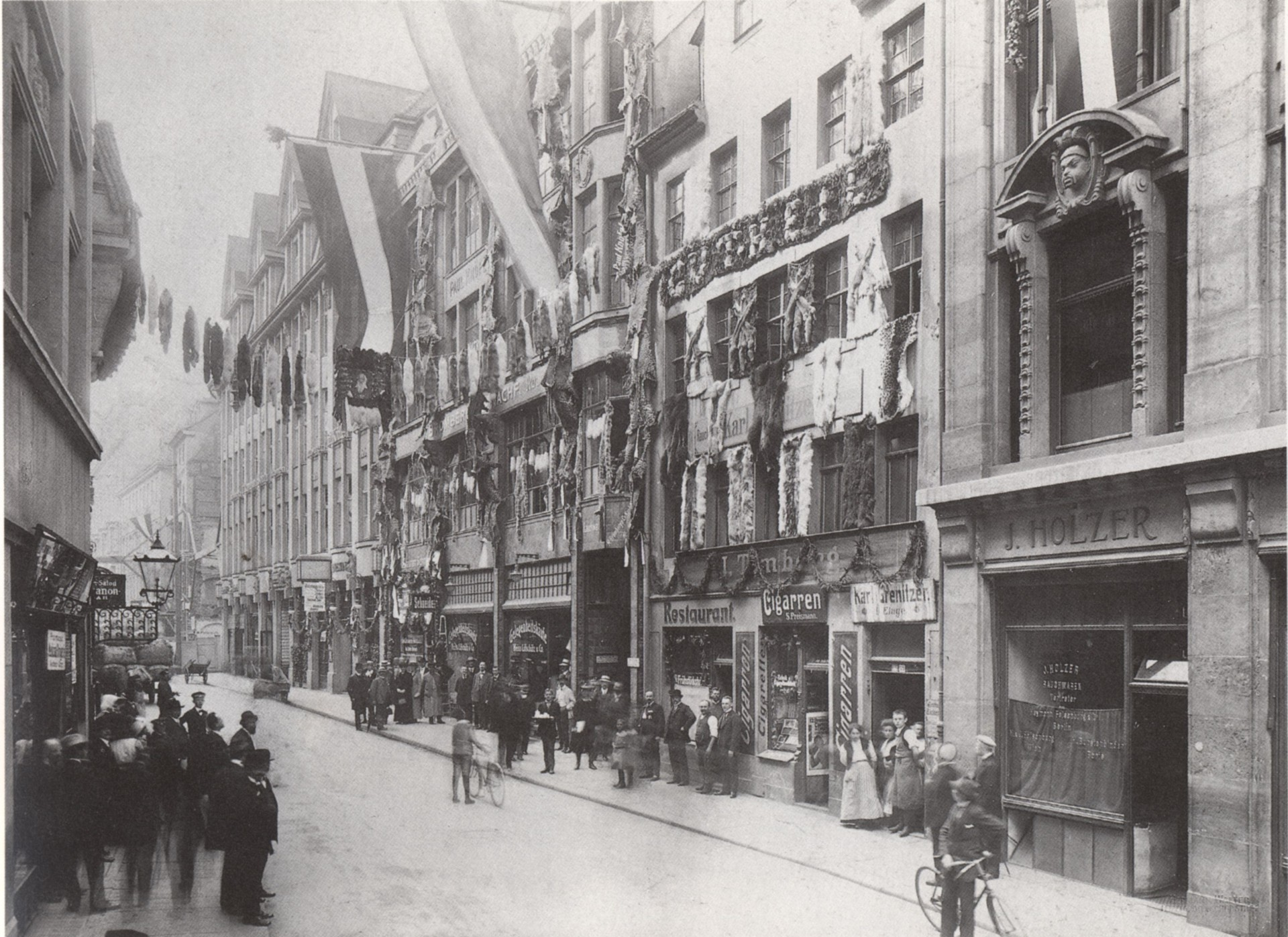
Fur-decorated business premises of M. Bromberg Nachf. (between the flags the building decorated with fur for a special occasion, 1913)

In 1837, Martin Bromberg opened a wholesale smoke shop under the company name M. Bromberg in Hamburg, Alter Steinweg 62 (same address as Wiener u. Pariser Mützenfabrik), later known as Kaiser-Wilhelm-Straße 70 and M. Bromberg & Co., Export, Alsterdamm 16/19, owned by M. and B. M. Bromberg and Fr. Cremer. In 1874, an important branch was opened in the fur center of Leipzig. Later, his son became a partner. When the son left the company around 1906 and a partner joined, it was renamed M. Bromberg & Co. Successor.

In 1914, the company advertised in an American trade journal that, in addition to its headquarters in Leipzig at Nikolaistraße 47–51, it had branches in the London fur district, Paris, Brussels and Berlin. The specialties on offer included Patagonian kit fox skins, also dyed on silver fox, bison skins or strips finished on sealskin, white fox skins in raw or finished form as well as Russian and German polecat skins, also in raw or finished form.

In 1920, Leipzig smoke merchants founded the "Deutsche Versuchszüchterei edler Pelztiere G.m.b.H. & Co.", later renamed "Deutsche Gesellschaft für Kleintier- und Pelztierzucht G.m.b.H. & Co.", to set up an experimental farm for breeding silver foxes. M. Bromberg & Co. Nachfolger was one of the founding members, along with other prominent smoking goods companies, with a general contribution of 30,000 marks each - it was the time of the beginning hyperinflation. The Hirschegg-Riezlern silver fox farm in Hirschegg in Kleinwalsertal in the Allgäu Alps was a model farm and the first Central European breeding farm for silver foxes.

When the Leipzig fur dealers founded an auction company in 1922, M. Bromberg & Co. Nachfolger participated with a probably smaller amount. In 1930, Bromberg and Julius Ariowitsch acquired shares in the Chinese fur trading company Siberian Fur Trading Company for 2 million marks.

== Nazi era ==
When the Nazis came to power, Jewish people were persecuted and their businesses targeted for boycotts, violence and seizure. In 1938, an Abraham Bromberg was still listed at Ritterstraße 23–29; the company was founded by him in 1882. However, the vast majority of Jewish smoke shops had given in to the pressure of National Socialism in the meantime and closed their businesses; most of the owners had emigrated.

=== Selter & Weinert ===
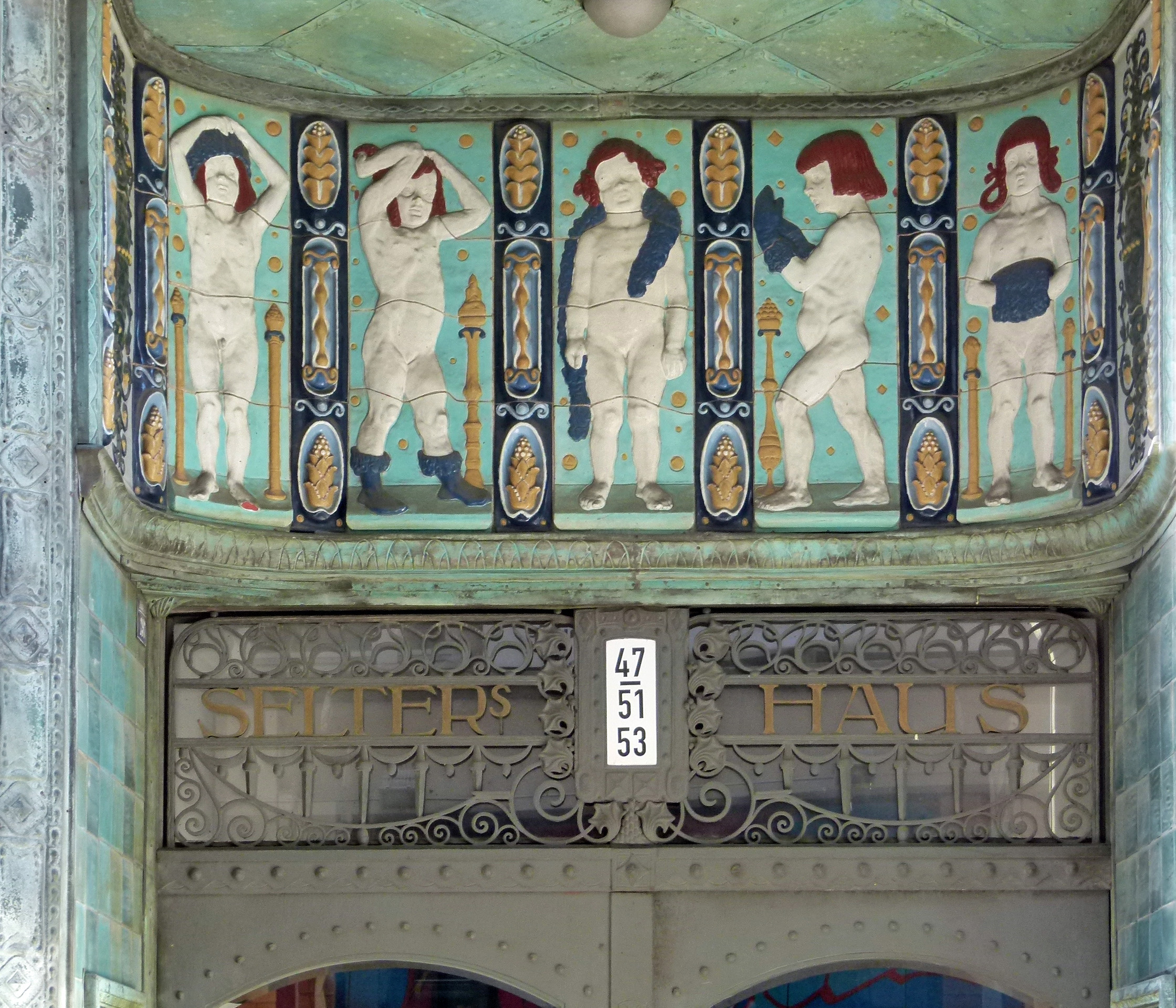
Picture frieze at the entrance to Selters Haus (2012)

After the death of Martin Bromberg, Alfred Selter (1864–1948) took over the company and continued to run it successfully. He later took on Carl Weinert as a partner in his business. He came from the important fur commission company Schmaltz & Weinert, which had represented the renowned company H. Wolff in Berlin for decades. His father, co-owner of Schmaltz & Weinert, which was dissolved in 1922, had previously died and Mr. Schmaltz had long since retired from managing the company. n 1919, the Selter company was renamed Selter & Weinert, Rauchwaren. Around 1940, Carl Weinert married Alfred Selter's daughter and continued to run the company together with his brother-in-law Kurt Selter.

Selter also rendered outstanding services to the organizational representation of the fur trade. In 1908, on his initiative, Leipzig's smoke goods wholesalers, commission agents and brokers joined to form the Verband der Leipziger Rauchwarenfirmen e. V., which in 1921 became the Reichsverband der deutschen Rauchwarenfirmen e. V., based in Leipzig, of which Selter was chairman. Like his father-in-law before him, Carl Weinert also became chairman of the Reichsverband.

Selter was chairman of the supervisory board of Rauchwaren-Lagerhaus GmbH, a joint venture of more than forty smoke retailers on the Brühl and held the title of Imperial Japanese Consul. He owned a villa built in 1909 by Leipzig architect Otto Paul Burghardt at Springerstrasse 6 in the northern suburbs of Leipzig.

After the war, the company was expropriated in 1946, three years before the GDR was founded. In addition to various other smoking goods companies, the building now housed the Deutsche Handelszentrale Textil, smoking goods branch, later the VEB Pelzhandel am Brühl. After reunification in 1990, the heirs of Alfred Selter and Carl Weinert became the owners again.

Kurt Selter is listed for the first time in the fur trade directory of 1953 at the latest in the newly established fur trade center Niddastrasse in Frankfurt am Main in the Biberhaus, Niddastrasse 56/58, still listed in 1967, it is no longer listed there by 1973 at the latest.
