= Europahaus (Leipzig) =

Coordinates: 51°20′14.42″N 12°22′53.32″E

Europahaus Leipzig
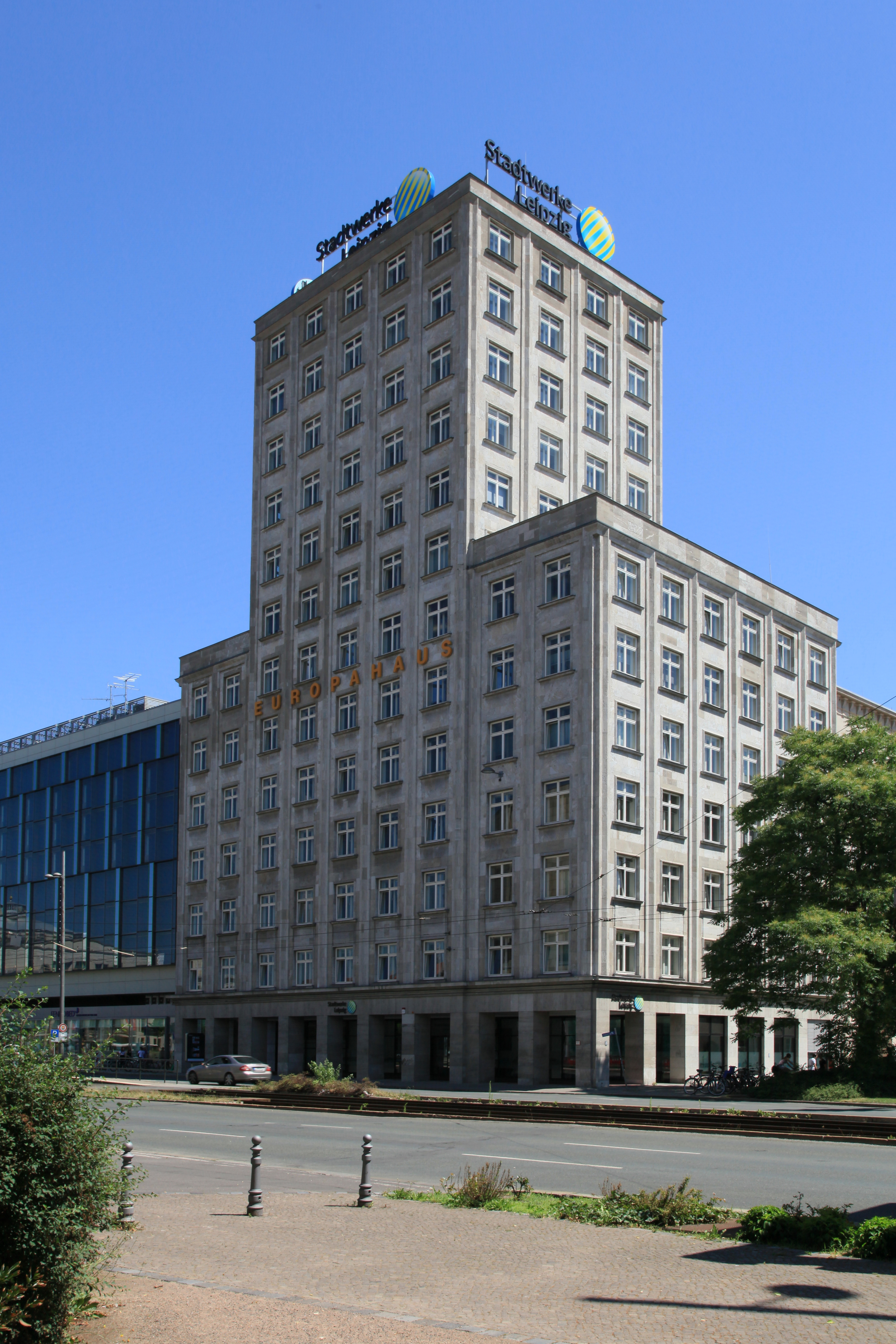
- Interactive map of the Europahaus Leipzig area

General information
- Status: Completed
- Type: Commercial offices
- Location: Augustusplatz 7 Leipzig, Germany
- Construction started: 1928
- Completed: 1929
- Opening: 1 January 1930
- Cost: 2 Mio. Reichsmark
- Owner: Union Investment

Height
- Roof: 56 m (184 ft)

Technical details
- Floor count: 13
- Floor area: 8,041 m^{2} (86,550 sq ft)

Design and construction
- Architect: Otto Paul Burghardt

The Europahaus in Leipzig is a 13-storey and 56 m (184 ft) tall listed office building at Augustusplatz 7.

== History ==
According to the 1928 ring city concept of the city planning officer Hubert Ritter, it was possible to build free-standing high-rise buildings along Leipzig's inner city ring road, which were intended to look like pillars in a city crown. Due to the Great Depression, only the Kroch High-rise and the Europahaus were actually realized in Leipzig at that time.

The Europahaus, the second high-rise in Leipzig, was built in 1928/29 by Otto Paul Burghardt (1875-1959) as a counterweight to the Kroch high-rise at the other side of the Augustusplatz. In May 1928, Burghardt had to follow demands from the Saxon Ministry of the Interior and had to revise his first draft, under the guidance of Wilhelm Kreis (1873–1955), in which the taller tower was in an axial corner position. Hereby, the facade of the office and commercial building got a significantly simplified form with a vertical structure running between the windows. Burghardt dispensed with any ornaments, and the house only takes effect by an expressionistic emphasis on the vertical. The revision was completed in July 1928, so that the shell was completed in early November 1929 and most of the rooms could be used from 1 January 1930.

The cost was 2 million Reichsmarks, 600,000 Reichsmarks were planned.

== Architecture and usage ==
The reinforced concrete skeleton building with shelly limestone cladding, which today borders directly on the Ringbebauung of the 1950s at the Roßplatz, consists of a 56 meter (184 ft.) tall tower with 13 floors, which has seven-storey side wings on both sides. Today's "Radisson Blu Hotel Leipzig" is directly connected on the other side. At the time of construction, there was a roof garden restaurant on the top of the high-rise building which is said to have been the “highest roof garden café in Europe” until the 1950s. According to the same source, early tenants included Claire Sigall, a gymnastics practice room on the 12th floor and Norddeutscher Lloyd on the ground floor. Since 2020, the city of Leipzig has officially reminded that the German golf publisher, which brought out the first German specialist magazine for the "entire sport of golf", had its headquarters in the Europahaus. The publishing house was owned by the family of Bernhard von Limburger, who won the German championship three times from 1921 to 1925.

In GDR times, the house was the seat of the district administration of the GDR State Insurance. In 1965, Frieder Gebhard and Hans-Joachim Dreßler carried out a reconstruction in the style of the 1960s, with the upper end being significantly altered. Colonnades were built on the ground floor, which were necessary after the inner city ring road had been widened. The building was renovated in 1997/98. The windows were renewed and repairs were carried out on the listed facade. Allianz Versicherungs-AG then moved in as the new host. After conversion and modernization work by Leipziger Stadtbau AG, the municipal energy supplier Stadtwerke Leipzig moved into the Europahaus in 2014 with around 160 employees. In 2015, the building was acquired by a Union Investment fund.

In Leipzig, there is also another operating association named Europahaus Leipzig e.V. since 1990, which has its headquarters elsewhere in Leipzig (address: Markt 10). The official EU information center Europe Direct for the Leipzig / West Saxony region is also located there and not at Augustusplatz.

== Gallery ==
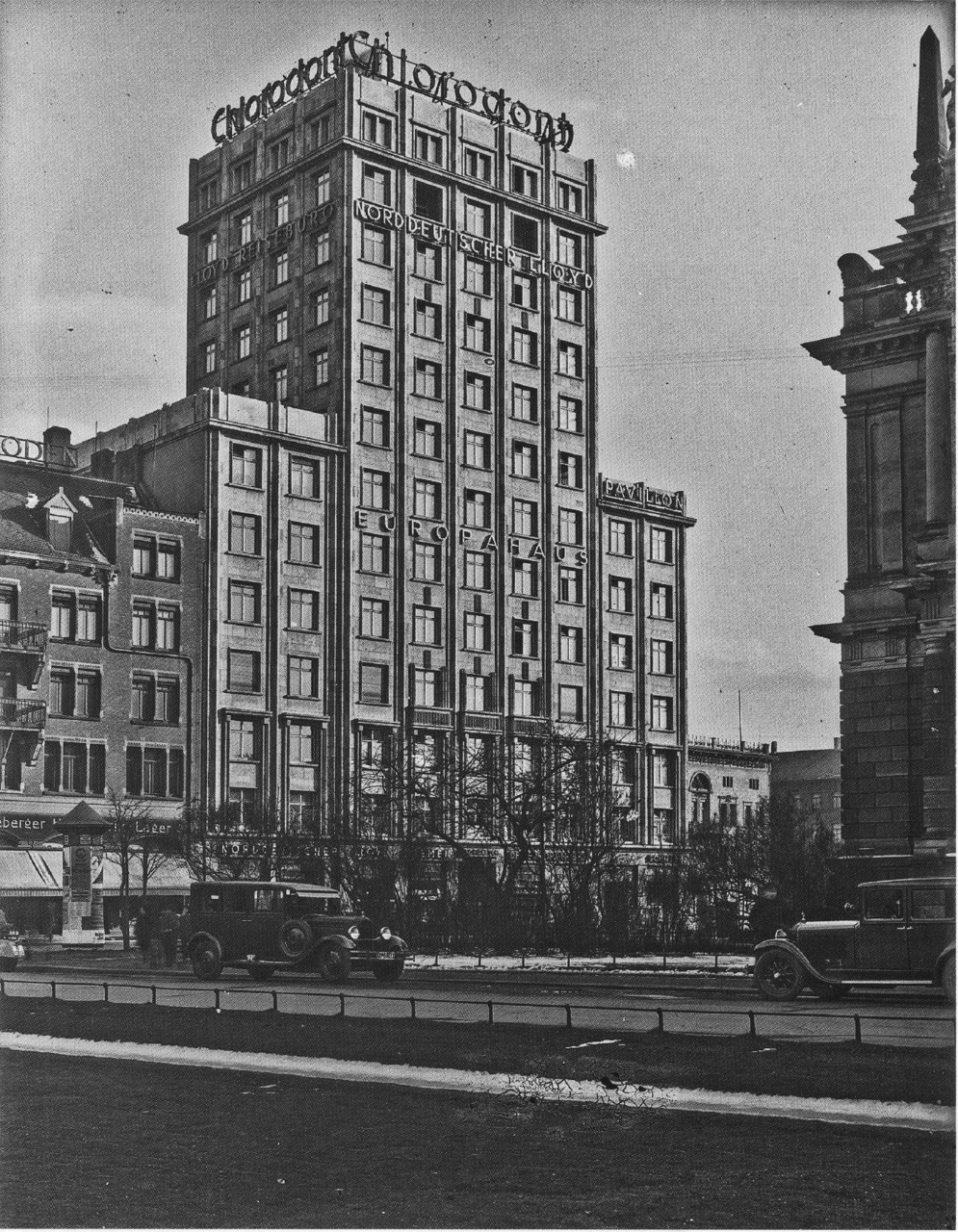
Pre-war image with a part of the Dutch House on the left and a part of the Leipzig Museum of Fine Arts in front, which were both destroyed in World War II

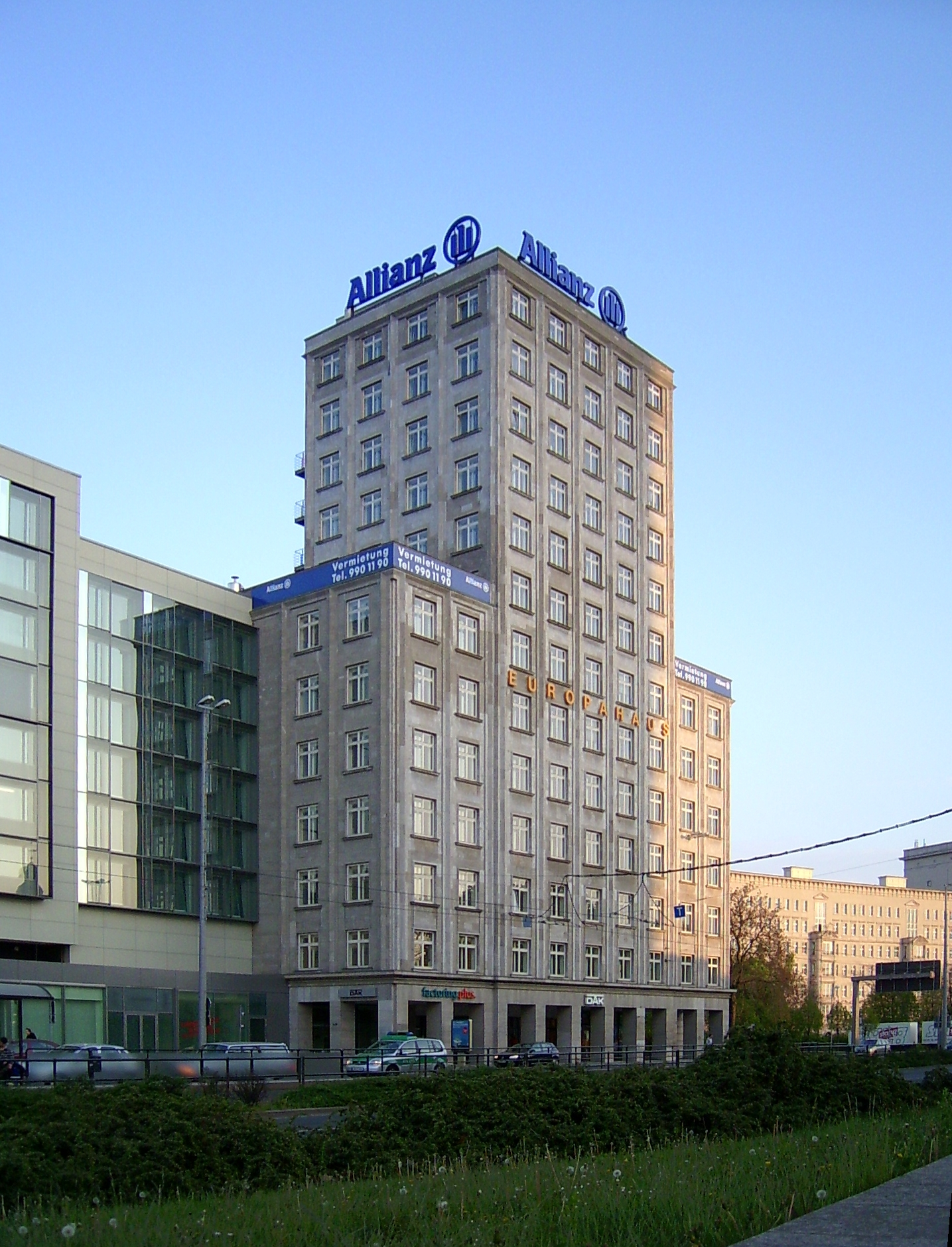
Europahaus as Leipzig branch of Allianz with corresponding electronic signage at the roof (2007)

== See also ==
- Architecture of Leipzig
- List of tallest buildings in Leipzig

== Literature ==
- Joachim Schulz, Wolfgang Müller and Erwin Schrödl, ed. (1976). Architekturführer DDR. Bezirk Leipzig (in German) (1 ed.). Berlin (GDR): VEB Verlag für Bauwesen. p. 34.
- Wolfgang Hocquél, Leipzig. Architektur von der Romanik bis zur Gegenwart, Passage-Verlag, Leipzig 2004, ISBN 3-932900-54-5, p. 122 f., in German
- Peter Leonhardt: Moderne in Leipzig. Architektur und Städtebau 1918 bis 1933. Pro Leipzig, Leipzig 2007, ISBN 978-3-936508-29-1, pp. 35–37 (in German)
- Weinkauf, Berndt: Architekturführer. Die 100 wichtigsten Leipziger Bauwerke. Berlin, Jaron Verlag, 2011. p. 156—157. ISBN 978-3-89773-913-0, in German
- Riedel, Horst (2005). Stadtlexikon Leipzig von A bis Z (in German). Leipzig: Pro Leipzig. p. 139. ISBN 3-936508-03-8.
- Annette Menting, Leipzig. Reclams Städteführer Architektur und Kunst, Reclam Verlag, Stuttgart 2015, ISBN 978-3-15-019259-7, pp. 48, 105 f. in German
- Ringel, Sebastian (2015). Leipzig! One Thousand Years of History. Leipzig: Autor und Edition Leipzig in Seemann Henschel GmbH & Co. KG. p. 151. ISBN 978-3-361-00710-9.
