= Wintergartenhochhaus =

High-rise building in Leipzig, Germany

Coordinates: 51.342706°N 12.383868°E

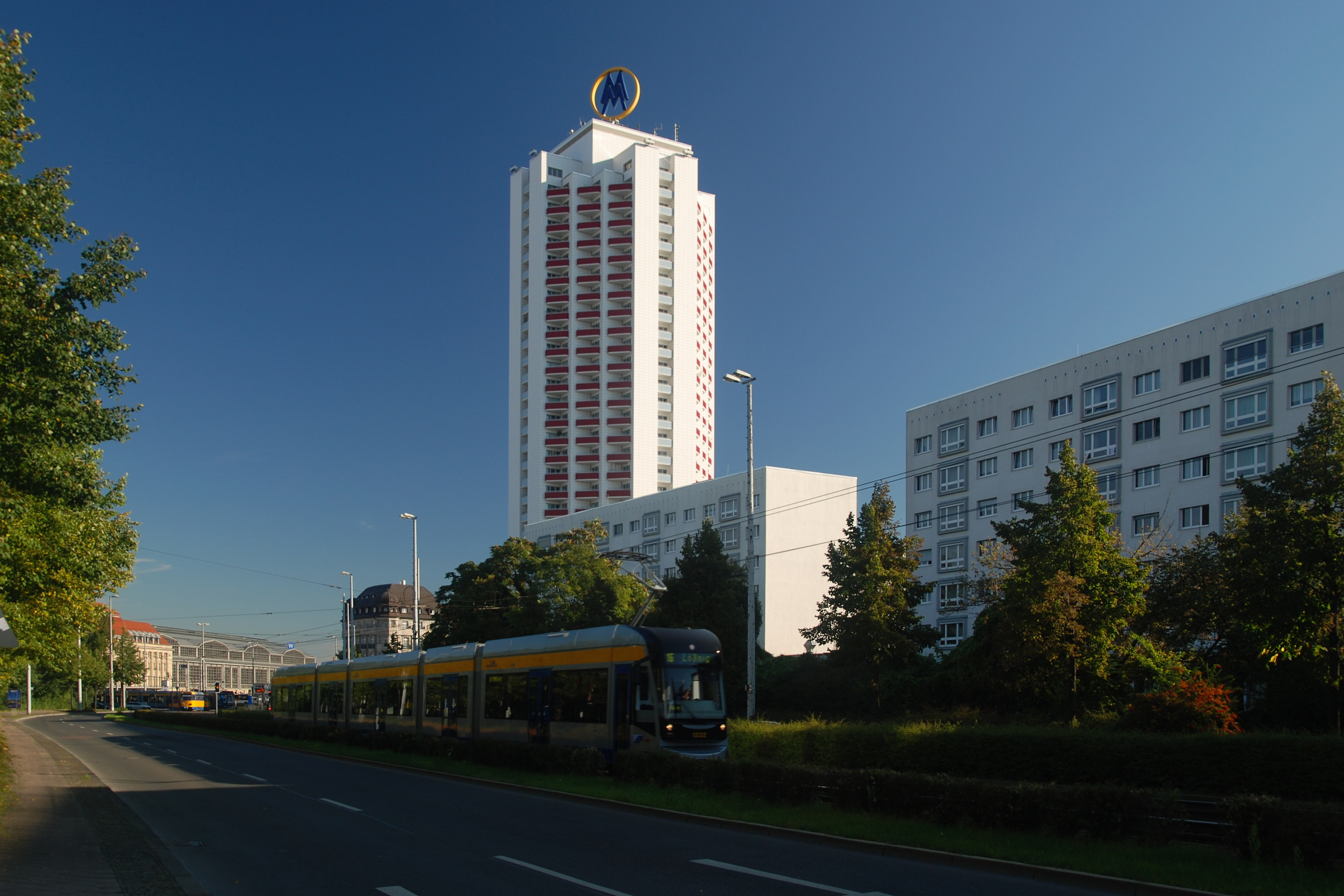
- Interactive map of the Wintergartenhochhaus area

General information
- Status: Completed
- Type: Residential
- Location: Wintergartenstraße 2 Leipzig, Germany
- Construction started: 1970
- Completed: 1972
- Cost: 52.88 million East German mark
- Owner: Leipziger Wohnungs- und Baugesellschaft (LWB)

Height
- Antenna spire: 106.8 m (350 ft)
- Roof: 95.5 m (313 ft)

Technical details
- Floor count: 32 of which 26 floors with apartments, 2 with businesses and several technic floors

Design and construction
- Architects: Horst Siegel with Ambros G. Gross, Frieder Gebhardt, Georg Eichhorn, Hans-Peter Schmiedel and Manfred Zumpe

References
- Web page of the owner

The Wintergartenhochhaus is a 32-story high-rise building in Leipzig-Mitte, subdivision Ostvorstadt. The residential building was built from 1970 to 1972 as Wohnhochhaus Wintergartenstraße (residential high-rise on Wintergartenstrasse) and is the third tallest high-rise in Leipzig after the City-Hochhaus and the Hotel The Westin. With a total height of 106.8 m (350 ft) and 95.5 m (313 ft) roof height, it was the tallest residential building in the East Germany and is now in the top hundred on the list of high-rise buildings in Germany. As a building of modernity and testimony of East German architectural history with rarity value, it is under cultural heritage protection.

== Location and urban classification ==
It is located north-east of the Inner City Ring Road at the junction with Wintergartenstrasse, diagonally opposite the main train station and not far from Augustusplatz. To the west is the park at the Schwanenteich. The high-rise is also known for the 18-ton advertising signet double M of the Leipzig Trade Fair that rotates on the roof.

In the late 1920s, the Ringcity-Concept of Hubert Ritter already contained the idea of erecting structural height dominants on the outside of the Inner City Ring Road. In 1970, the urban planners from the office of the chief architect of the city of Leipzig specified conceivable locations for the Wintergartenhochhaus and the City-Hochhaus.

The urban planning classification and the distinctive architectural expressiveness resulted from the choice of location, the functional requirements and the applied building technology processes. For the Wintergartenhochhaus, the effectiveness in the urban space with the curved shape of the existing buildings was particularly important, since the high-rise could only be classified behind the extended building line. The two-story porch, with its long west façade, followed the slightly curved line of the building specified by the apartment blocks on Georgiring.

Short preparation times required the concentrated effort of committed architects and engineers as well as the use of the experience that the East Berlin Wohnungsbaukombinat (housing construction combine) already had with regard to industrial monolithic construction for high-rise residential buildings.

== History ==
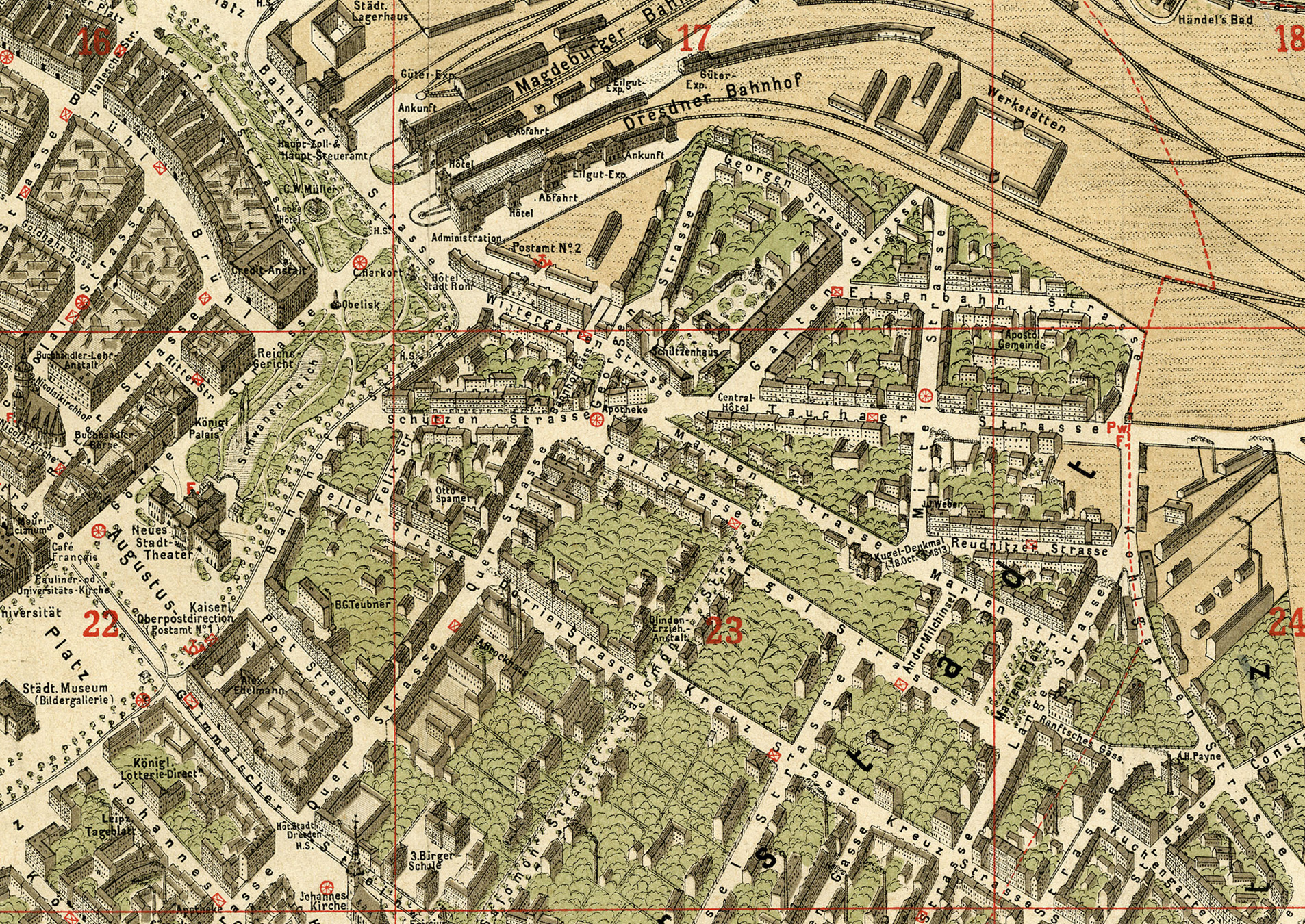
Plan of the development on Wintergartenstrasse (around 1881)

The name Wintergartenhochhaus refers as well as the name of the street to a garden laid out there in 1809 which its owner Christian August Breiter let furnish with green houses (in German: Wintergarten) for exotic plants. The building was built on the site between Schützenstraße (formerly Hintergasse) and his former garden complex, which in the first third of the 19th century extended to the Back Gate of the town's fortification – roughly to the junction with today's Chopinstraße. In the course of the development of the Ostvorstadt at this point with the Krystallpalast (Crystal Palace) and residential buildings, the two hotels "Continental" and "Stadt Rom" were built at the end of the century near the station at the beginning of Wintergartenstraße. During the air raids in World War II, the second was severely damaged and demolished in 1969 to create space for the construction of the Wintergartenhochhaus. A number of residential buildings on Schützenstraße, which originally had a direct connection to the Ring Road, were also demolished for the construction of the high-rise building. Access is now blocked off by one of the 10-storey prefabricated buildings on Georgiring, which had previously been built between 1960 and 1962. A pedestrian passageway to the Ring Road only exists at the Wintergartenhochhaus.

== Architecture and description ==
Ground plan by Horst Siegel

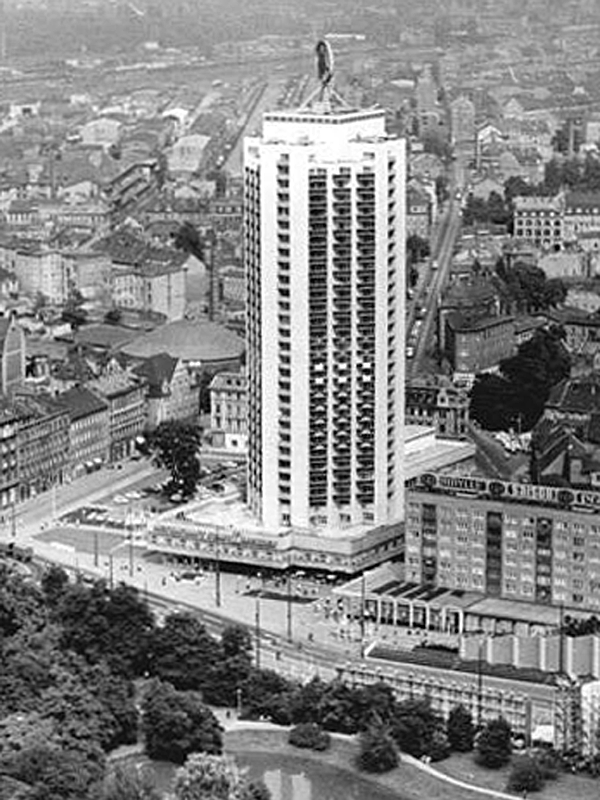
Wintergartenhochhaus with extensions in 1977

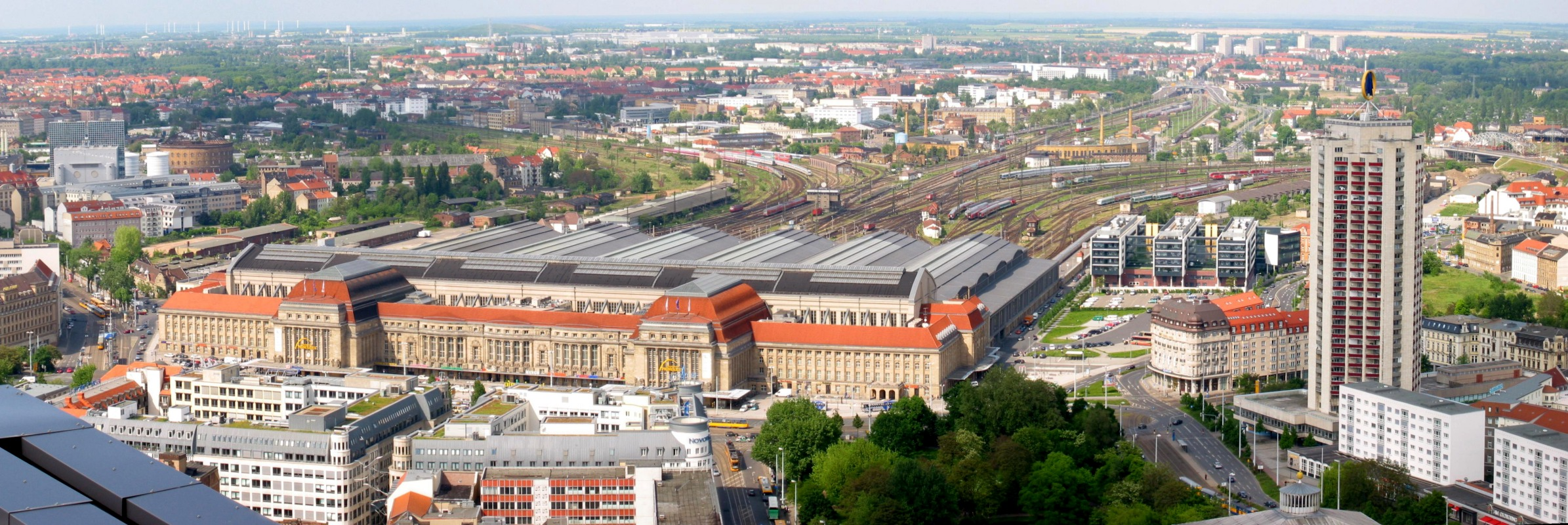
View from the City-Hochhaus to the main train station with the Wintergartenhochhaus (before the renovation)

The urban-architectural draft from the years 1967/1968 comes from Horst Siegel together with Ambros G. Gross, Frieder Gebhardt, Georg Eichhorn, Hans-Peter Schmiedel and Manfred Zumpe. Its characteristic features are the symmetrical floor plan with 16 outer corners and twelve three- and four square loggias per floor, giving the impression of an octagonal building. It has a diameter of 32.4 m (106 ft). Manfred Zumpe took up the shape of the Wintergartenhochhaus a few years later in his dodecagonal house, in which the four diagonal sides only have two instead of the three triangular loggias.

The draft processing and implementation planning was in the hands of Frieder Gebhardt, Hartmut Stüber, Reinhard Vollschwitz, Achim Schulz and Friedhard Schinkitz.

It was the first high-rise residential building to be built in East Germany using the slip-on construction method with a finished outer skin. Originally, three of these houses were to be built, but only one was built for cost reasons. The pure construction costs amounted to 52.88 million East German Mark. 2038 tons of steel, 4784 tons of cement and 12,000 cubic meters of concrete were used within 26 months. Due to the difficult ground conditions, it had to be erected in a concrete floor trough, which required subsoil drilling down to a depth of 50 m (160 ft). A large, two-storey porch was erected at the foot of the high-rise building, surrounding the core building mainly from the west and north. In it were the "shopping center at the main station" (self-service department store), the restaurant "City of Dresden" with 220 seats, a post office and a "Mocha milk bar".

== Redeveloping ==
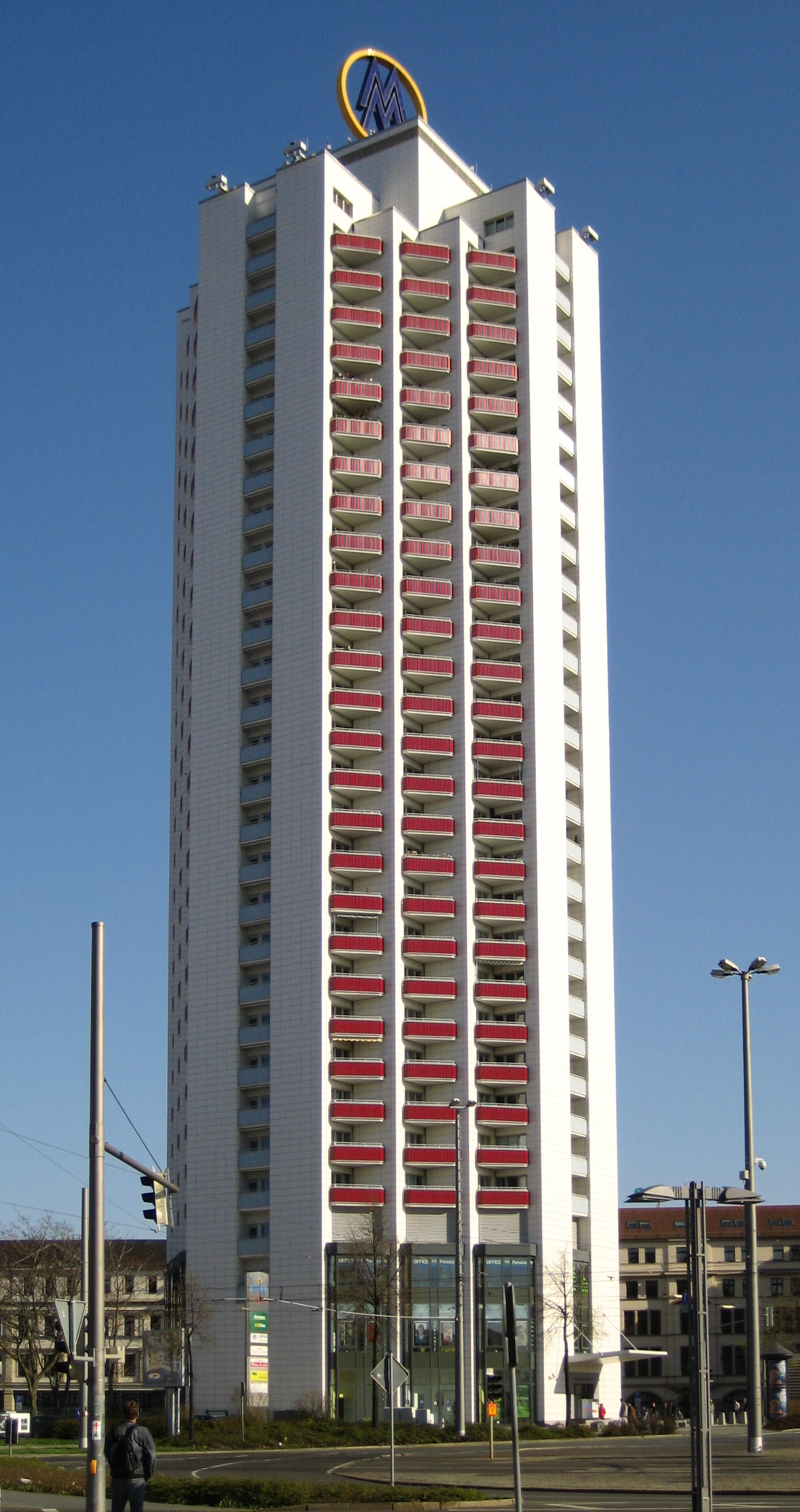
April 2010, Wintergartenhochhaus seen from the main station (after redevelopment)

In 2004 and 2005 it was completely renovated for 12.5 million euros to be a jewel for the 2006 FIFA World Cup. The two-storey porch was demolished and a three-storey zone for commercial tenants was set up in the base of the high-rise. Today there are 29 one-, 78 two- and 100 three-room apartments and some offices in the Wintergartenhochhaus. Over 95 percent of the apartments have at least one balcony or loggia. The owner of the high-rise is the city-owned Leipzig housing and construction company (LWB). In place of the demolished buildings, the new LWB building, a hotel and several residential buildings, have been erected at the foot of the Wintergartenhochhaus since 2015. In the spring of 2017, the rotating double M of the Leipzig Trade Fair was renovated. The 600 m (2,000 ft) of fluorescent tubes were replaced by LEDs, also for cost reasons. To mark the centenary of the Leipzig Trade Fair's trademark, a »100« 4 m (13 ft) tall and 6 m (20 ft) wide was installed on 4 September 2017. From April 2021 to March 2022, the elevators used for the residential floors, last renovated in 1998, were replaced. For this purpose, all installations in the four shafts, each 87 m (285 ft) high, were removed and replaced with new, modern elevator systems.

== See also ==
- List of tallest buildings in Leipzig
- List of tallest buildings in Germany

== Literature ==
- Wolfgang Hocquél, Leipzig. Architektur von der Romanik bis zur Gegenwart, 2. stark erweiterte Auflage, Passage Verlag, Leipzig 2004, ISBN 3-932900-54-5, pp. 134–136 (in German).
- Horst Riedel : Hochhaus Wintergartenstraße. In: Stadtlexikon Leipzig von A bis Z. PRO LEIPZIG, Leipzig 2012, ISBN 978-3-936508-82-6, p. 241 (in German).
- Tanja Scheffler, Das Wohnhochhaus an der Wintergartenstraße. Eine städtebauliche Dominante am Promenadenring, in: Leipziger Blätter, issue 74, 2019, ISSN 0232-7244, pp. 74–78 (in German).
- Sabine Knopf: Wintergartenhochhaus. In: Leipziger Spaziergänge – Ostvorstadt. Lehmstedt, Leipzig 2020, ISBN 978-3-95797-088-6, p. 6–7 (in German).
- Menting, Annette (2022). Leipzig. Architektur und Kunst. Ditzingen: Reclam-Verlag. p. 103f. ISBN 978-3-15-014310-0 (in German).
- Ringel, Sebastian (2022). Vom Wandel der Leipziger Vorstädte. 300 verlorene Bauten aus 160 Jahren. Leipzig: überland Verlagsgesellschaft. ISBN 978-3-948049-07-2 (in German).
