= Clara-Zetkin-Park (Leipzig) =

Public park in Saxony, Germany

Coordinates: 51.33067°N 12.35564°E

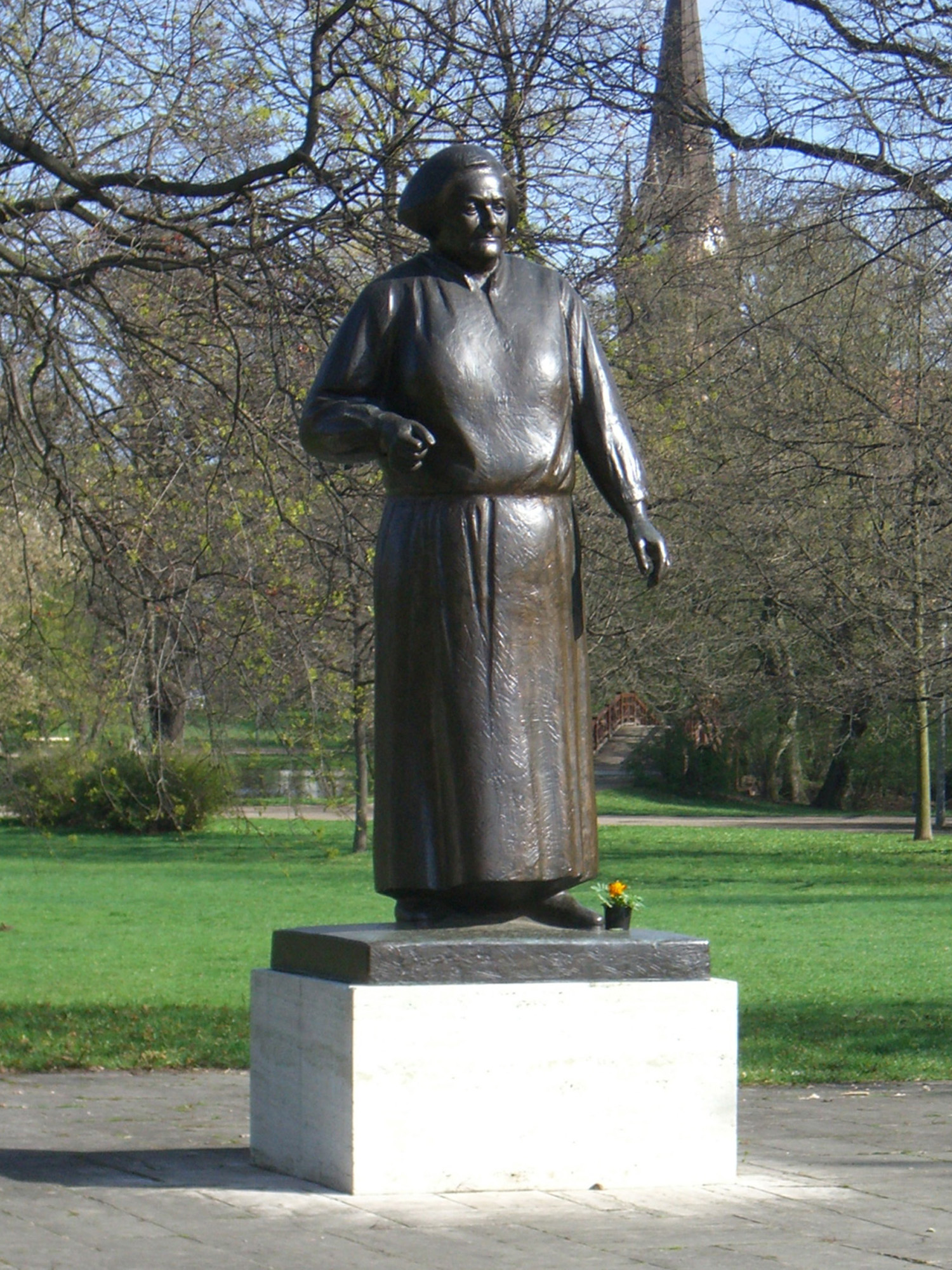
- Statue of Clara Zetkin at the Johannapark (2010)
- Interactive map of Clara-Zetkin-Park
- Type: Urban park
- Location: Leipzig, Saxony, Germany
- Area: 125 ha (310 acres)
- Created: 1955
- Open: all year round

The Clara-Zetkin-Park (colloquially Clara-Park) is a park in Leipzig. From 1955 until 2011 it was Leipzig's largest park with an area of 125 hectares (309 acres) and was called Zentraler Kulturpark Clara Zetkin (Clara Zetkin Central Culture Park). The name was changed in 2011 and since then the Johannapark and the Palmengarten have officially been considered independent parks (previously they belonged to the Clara Zetkin Central Culture Park).

Since 2011, only the previous Scheibenholzpark and König-Albert-Park (named after Albert of Saxony) are called Clara-Zetkin-Park. The park, named after the politician and women's rights activist Clara Zetkin (1857-1933), is located on the southwestern edge of the Stadtbezirk Mitte - about two kilometers (1.2 mi.) southwest of the city center on the edge of the Musikviertel. The park represents the connection between the northern and southern parts of the Leipzig Riverside Forest.

The Clara-Zetkin-Park is divided by the Elsterflutbett (the flood channel of the Elster) in an eastern and a western part which are connected by The Saxons' Bridge (Litt.: Sachsenbrücke).

== History and Names ==
In 1955, based on a decision by the Leipzig city council, the existing parks Johannapark, Scheibenholzpark, König-Albert-Park and Palmengarten were combined and given the name Central Culture Park "Clara Zetkin". In addition to the formal amalgamation, the park was further developed in the spirit of the culture park movement of the time by incorporating cultural and sports facilities. It is probably the first large plant in Germany that was designed according to these aspects and thus served as a role model.

The groundbreaking ceremony took place on 8 January 1955, and the park was inaugurated as early as 1 May 1955, which in the sense of the propaganda of the time was praised as "fulfillment of the electoral mandate to the Volkskammer deputy Paul Fröhlich (1913–1970 / First Secretary of the Bezirksleitung Leipzig of the Socialist Unity Party of Germany), which he had received from Leipzig workers".

Most of the cultural and sporting facilities were built in the years following the opening. These included an outdoor theater, a café, event pavilions, a large children's playground with a snack pavilion, the building of the Leipzig Chess Center, the Dahlia Terrace, an open-air bowling alley and, at times, a training tower for GST parachutists.

On 3 July 1967, on the occasion of Clara Zetkin's 110th birthday, the bronze statue of the Clara Zetkin memorial, a work by the sculptor Walter Arnold (1909-1979), was unveiled at the southern tip of Johannapark, at the former site of the Otto von Bismarck memorial.

In 2010, after receiving a petition, the city administration of Leipzig mandated a commission to check whether the parts of the park should be renamed to their original names and whether the name Clara-Zetkin-Park should be completely revoked. This led to a wave of protests. In April 2011, the city council decided that the names of the Central cultural park "Clara Zetkin" and Volkspark im Scheibenholz should be canceled and that the previous sub-areas of Palmengarten, Klingerhain, Johannapark and Richard-Wagner-Hain would get their old names back. Since then, the former König-Albert-Park (later Albertpark) has been called Clara-Zetkin-Park together with the previous Scheibenholzpark, because this name has caught on with the population. By the act of renaming the Clara Zetkin memorial is no longer in Clara Zetkin Park, but in Johanna Park.

== Usage ==
From 1950 to 1958, the 4.3 km (2.7 mi.) long route of the Leipzig Stadtparkrennen (City park races for motorcycles, sports and racing cars) with up to 200,000 spectators led around and through the park area; most of the 11 events were also the GDR motor racing championships.

In the years after 2000, the former cultural park offerings were reactivated. In the summer months, the outdoor theater named Parkbühne is a special attraction for concerts and cinema performances and is also one of the open-air venues for the Wave-Gotik-Treffen. The large playground at the southeast end of the park has been redesigned. The former café is now the Glashaus Restaurant, and a commercially operated beer and café garden with public events was created at the reconstructed historical music pavilion.

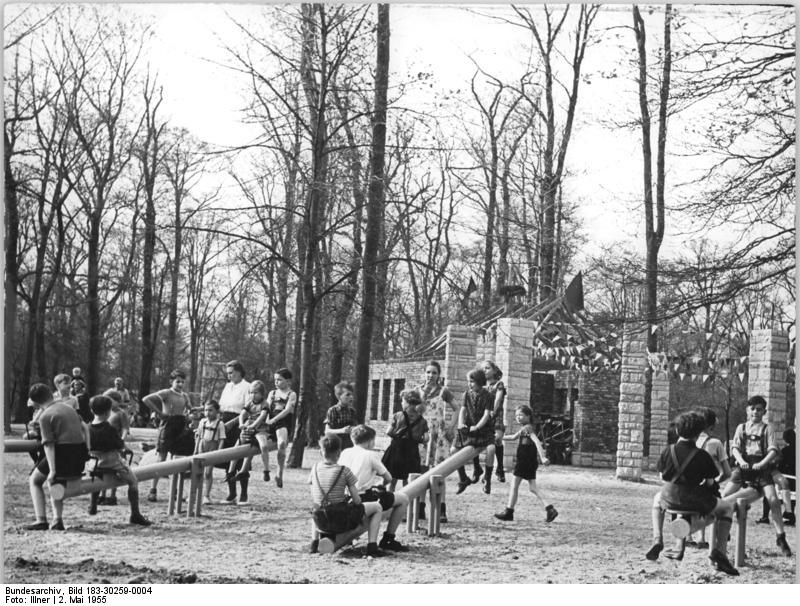
In the park at the time of its opening (1955)

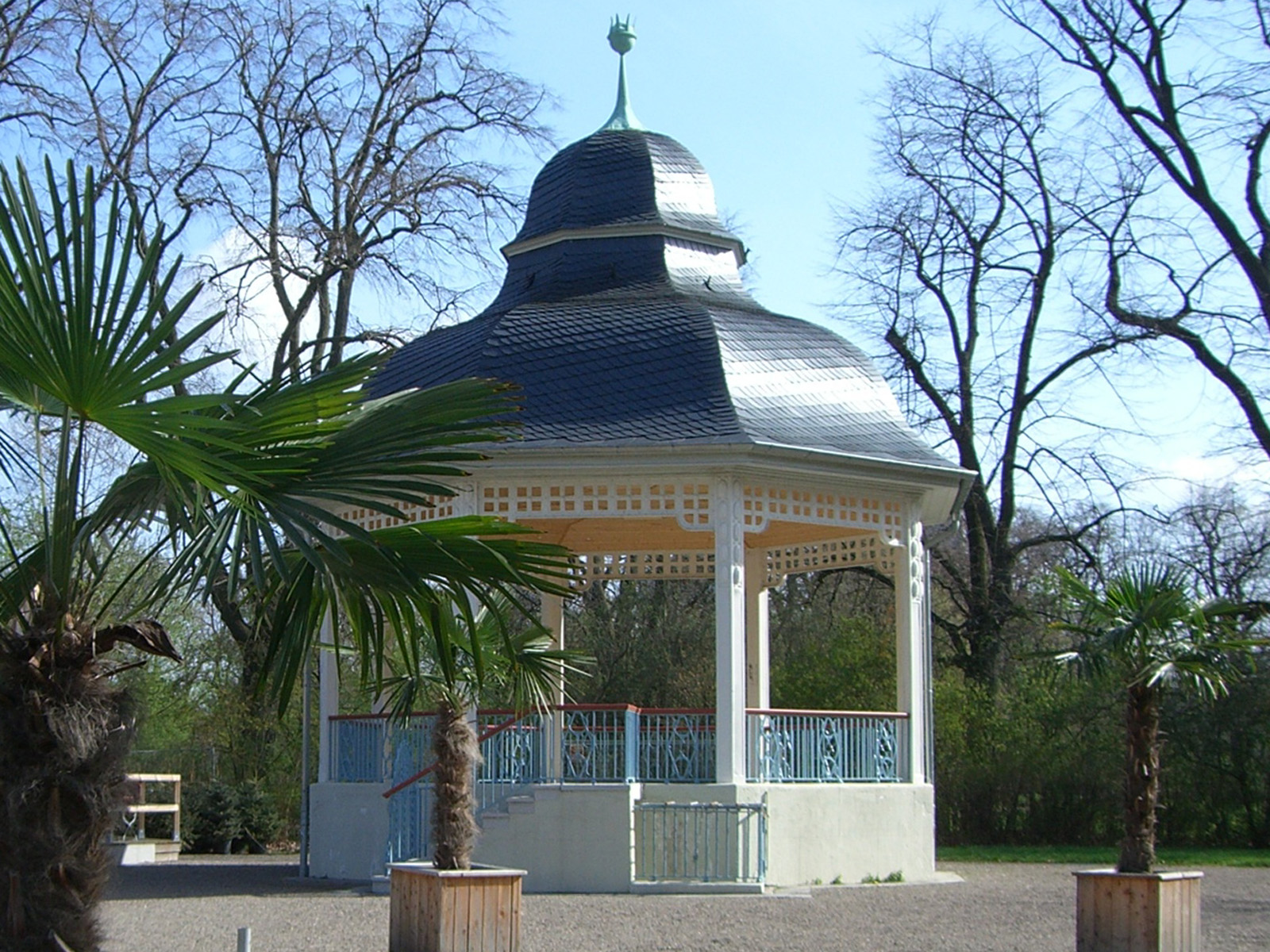
The reconstructed historical music pavilion (2010)

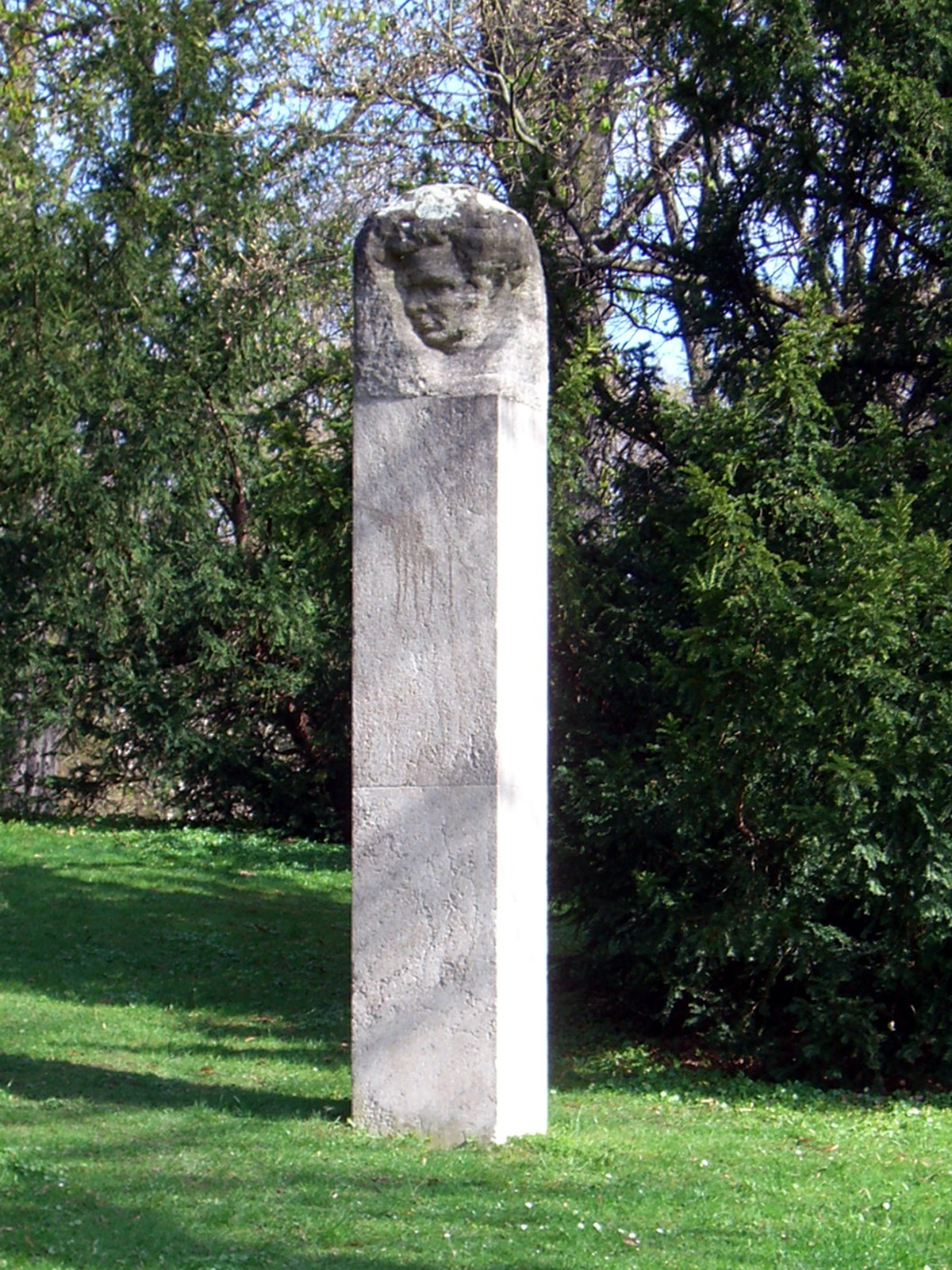
Das Franz-Schubert-Memorial (2010)

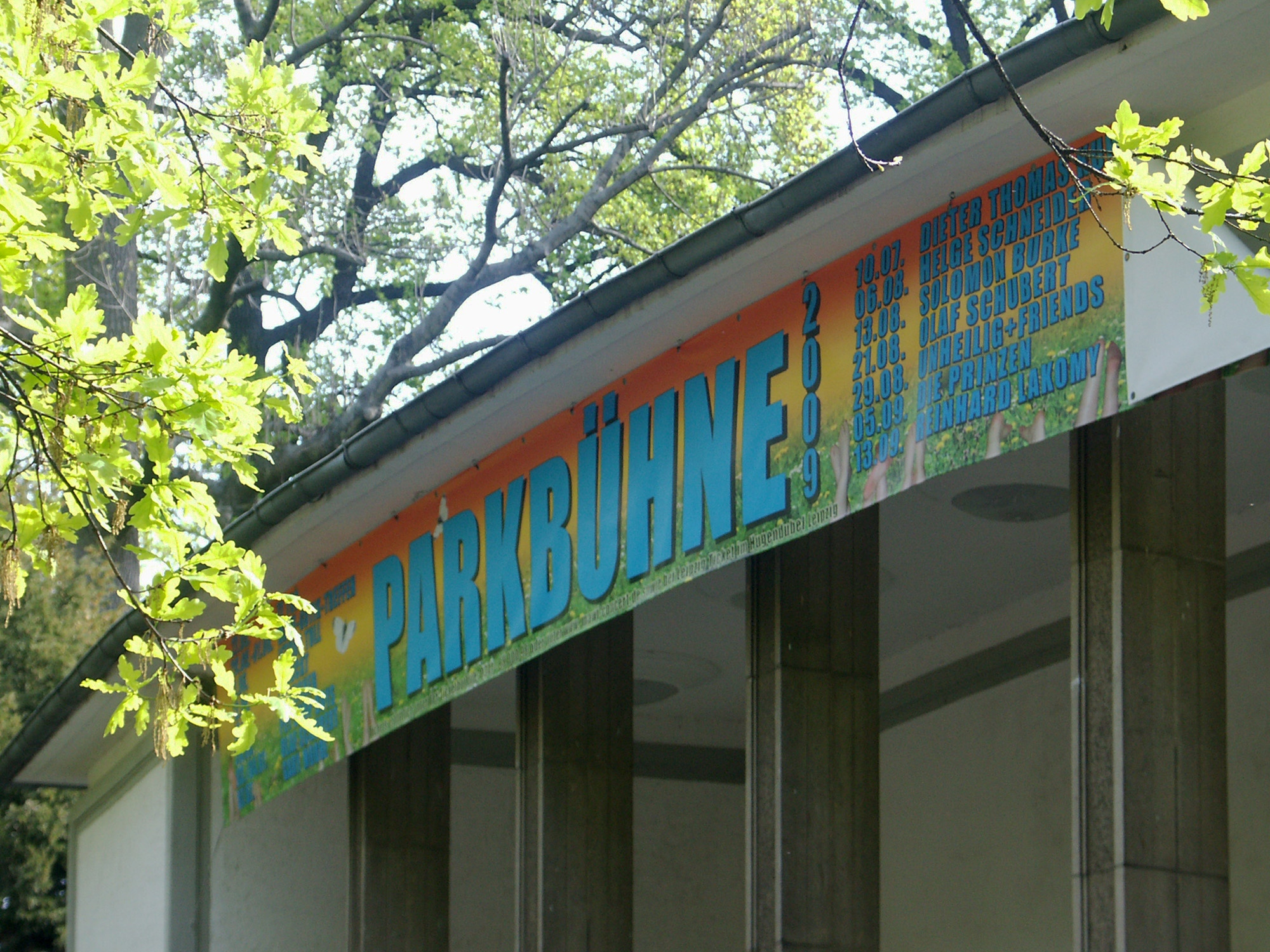
Outdoor theater (2010)

== Sporting activities ==
In addition to the runners on the park paths, the bituminized Anton-Bruckner-Allee is a favorite meeting place for inline skating. In the western part of the park, the sports club BSV AOK Leipzig e. V. has its center for health sports, in which rehabilitation sports are offered in addition to prophylactic health and fitness sports. 4600 club members in 313 sports groups are looked after. A modern miniature golf course completes the facility.

Every year in January, the Leipzig Winter Marathon takes place in the Clara-Zetkin-Park and the neighboring forest area Die Nonne. 8 laps of 5 kilometers (3.1 mi.) and 1 lap of 1.95 kilometers (1.2 mi.) are run. The Spring Run follows in March with distances of 5 and 10 kilometers (3.1 and 6.2 mi.) and in May the Leipzig Women's Run with distances of 2.5, 5 and 10 kilometers (1.55, 3.1 and 6.2 mi.).

== See also ==
- Racecourse Scheibenholz

== Literature ==
- Marko Kuhn: Der Clara-Zetkin-Park. Spuren auf Eis und Asphalt. In: Volker Rodekamp (ed.): In Bewegung. Meilensteine der Leipziger Sportgeschichte (thema.M. 20). Leipzig 2018, ISBN 978-3-910034-80-8, p. 150–157 (in German)
- Clara-Zetkin-Park, in: Peter Benecken, Parks & Gärten im Grünen Ring Leipzig, ed. by Pro Leipzig, Stadt Leipzig, Grüner Ring and culturtraeger Leipzig, Leipzig 2014, ISBN 978-3-945027-10-3, p. 18f. (in German)
