= Racecourse Scheibenholz =

Horse racing track in Leipzig, Germany

Racecourse Scheibenholz Galopprennbahn Scheibenholz
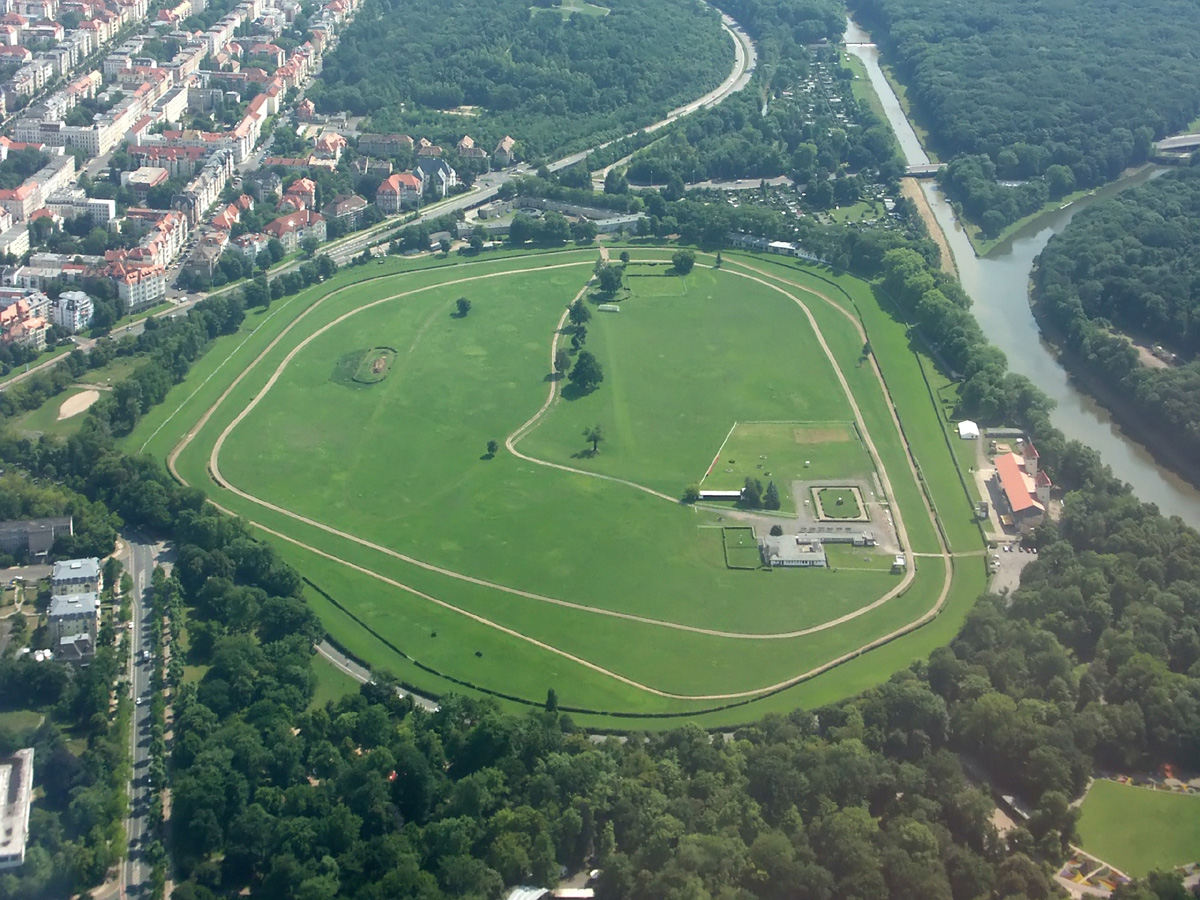
- The racecourse seen from the sky (south direction)
- Interactive map of Racecourse Scheibenholz; Galopprennbahn Scheibenholz
- Location: Leipzig, Germany
- Coordinates: 51.325034°N 12.361422°E
- Owned by: City of Leipzig
- Operated by: Leipziger Reit- und Rennverein Scheibenholz e. V. (LRRS)
- Date opened: 14 september 1867
- Race type: Horse racing
- Course type: Flat

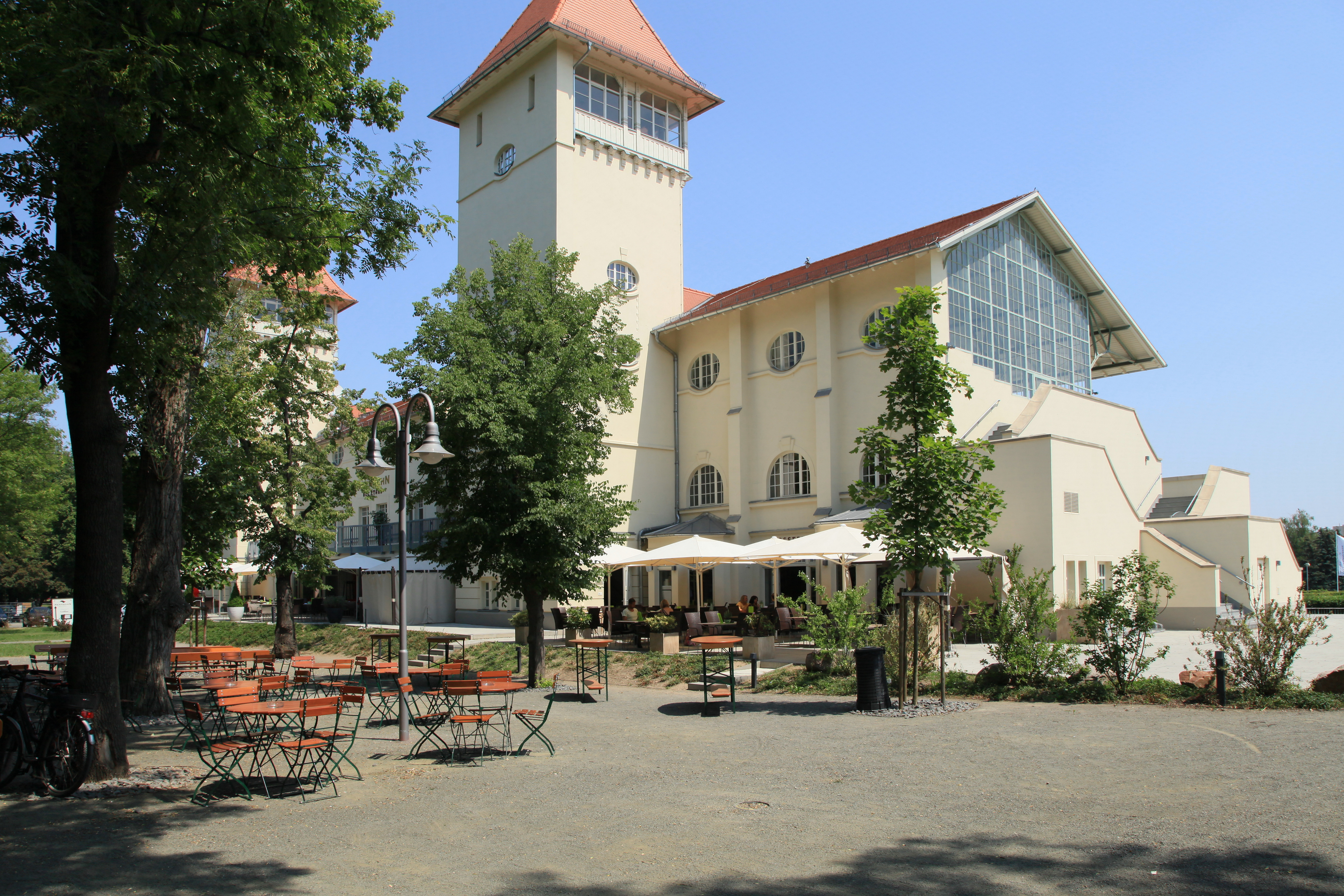
Beer garden at the racecourse Scheibenholz

The Racecourse Scheibenholz (Galopprennbahn Scheibenholz) is a racecourse in Leipzig, Saxony, Germany. It was founded in 1867 on wooded land in the Leipzig Riverside Forest belonging to the Scheibe family, hence its name. It is managed by the Leipziger Reit- und Rennverein Scheibenholz e. V. (LRRS).

== Situation ==
The racecourse is located in Leipzig-Südvorstadt, southwest of the city center. It is surrounded by the banks of the Pleisse Flood Channel to the west, Clara-Zetkin-Park to the north, Karl-Tauchnitz-Strasse and the neighbourhood Musikviertel to the west, Wundtstrasse to the southwest, and Schleussiger Weg to the south. It covers an area of approximately 30 hectares (74 acres).

The length of a lap is 1.75 kilometres (1.09 miles), before 1932 the length was 1.25 kilometres (0.78 miles).

== Building ==
In 1867, a wooden grandstand was constructed by the master carpenter Steib. In 1907, the grandstand was rebuilt as a 2-storey elongated grandstand building with two towers after the plans of the architect Otto Paul Burghardt. The architectural style is Historicism and Art Nouveau. In 1907, also a restaurant was added.

== Various ==
On 1 May every year, the opening of the racing season is celebrated.

== See also ==
- List of horse racing venues
