= Constantin Lipsius =

German architect and architectural theorist

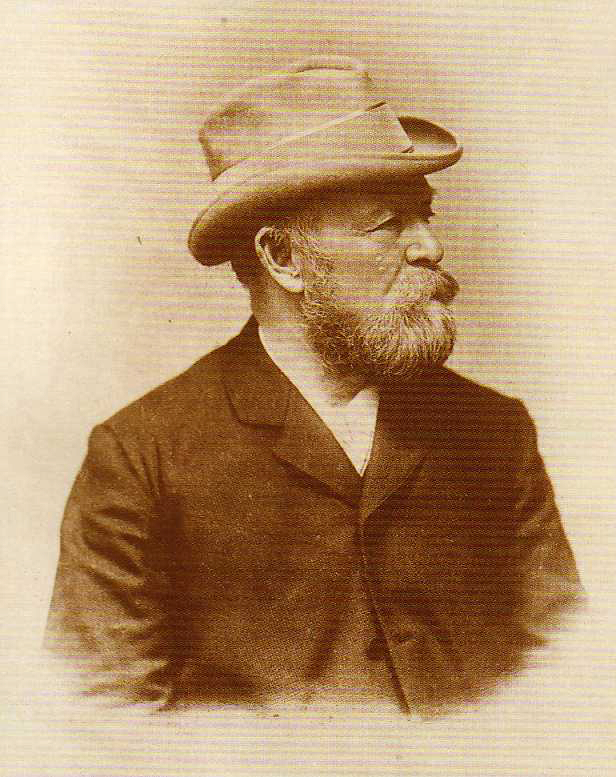
Constantin Lipsius, ca. 1890

Johannes Wilhelm Constantin Lipsius (20 October 1832 – 11 April 1894) was a German architect and architectural theorist, best known for his controversial design of the Royal Academy of Fine Arts and Exhibition Building (1883–1894) on the Brühl Terrace in Dresden, today known as the Lipsius-Bau.

== Life and work ==
Lipsius was born in Leipzig. After attending Gymnasium, he initially studied architecture at the Leipzig Baugewerkenschule and in 1851 assumed a three-year course of study at the Royal Art Academy of Dresden in the atelier of Georg Hermann Nicolai (1812–1881), Gottfried Semper's immediate successor at the Academy. Following his matriculation, Lipsius toured Italy, where he was fascinated by the architecture of Venice. He continued his travels by heading to Paris, where he worked briefly for Jacques Ignaz Hittorf and became aware of the work of Henri Labrouste and Charles Garnier and Eugène Emanuelle Viollet-le-Duc. French influences became marked in Lipsius's later work.

Beginning in the 1860s, Lipsius participated in a number of regional and national architectural competitions while he continued to broaden his practice with residential commissions and preservation work. His participation in the 1866 competition for an Art Academy in Dresden exhibits several features that would appear in his final designs some twenty years later. Lipsius's winning entry for the reconstruction of Leipzig's Johannis Hospital garnered him professional recognition as königliche Baurat, or "royal architectural counsellor." In the following decade, Lipsius continued to expand his work. In 1874, he was named president of the newly organized Union of Leipzig Architects and assumed directorship of the Baugewerkenschule. In 1877, Lipsius started his long-term work on the preservation of Leipzig's Thomaskirche, J. S. Bach's church; work continued until 1889. Local preservation authority Heinrich Magirius has stated that Lipsius's work was the most significant accomplishment of its kind in Saxony. Also in the late 1870s, Lipsius began his professional association with architect August Hartel (1844–1890), which included designing the Peterskirche (Leipzig), the Johanneskirche (Gera) and an entry in the second Reichstag competition of 1882.

With Nicolai's death in 1881, Lipsius was named Professor of Architecture at the Dresden Academy. He received the commission to rebuild the Academy complex shortly after assuming his new academic post and it soon became a hotly contested project that was covered in the national trade journals. The basis for much of the controversy was that the building, in both major design phases, was considered too large for the site. In addition, it was not deemed by many to be an accurate reflection of the more delicate local Neo-Renaissance styles of Semper and Nicolai. Finally, the fact that the commission was given without the benefit of a public competition guaranteed no small amount of professional resentment. Opinions, then as now, tend to be rather polarized. Some residents, for instance, still regard the unusual pleated parabolic glass dome, locally called the "Lemon Press," an enduring annoyance. But there can be little doubt that the design represented the most advanced architectural thinking of the early- to mid-1880s on the continent. It represented a conservative approach to architectural iconography based on the decorative program of Semper's Kunsthistorisches Museum in Vienna; at the same time, Lipsius was employing architectural symbolism to advocate an evolutionary approach to stylistic innovation. Hence the bizarre glazed dome as a representation of an arbitrary, futuristic form for non-representational architecture. These ideas, which Lipsius based explicitly on the theories of Gottfried Semper, represent the first phase of architectural realism. Shortly after the Academy complex was completed, it was regarded as a grotesque, over-ornamented monstrosity, and architectural realism had already moved on to become a more strident theoretical stance in the work of Otto Wagner.

Lipsius was a thoughtful and philosophically inclined architect. His writings on the use of iron in architecture have found their way into several histories of architectural theory; his necrologies of both Semper and Nicolai are among the most well-conceived professional biographies of their time. His students remembered him with enormous affection. By the 1880s, Lipsius was an eloquent proponent of architectural realism, an approach to revitalizing contemporary architecture by changing the emphasis away from slavish imitation of historical forms by reconsidering the original and symbolic power of architectural motifs. Thus fortified, it was hoped by Architectural Realists in Germany, Austria, Switzerland and France that stylistic innovation could continue to develop organically by salvaging worthy forms and discarding dry, pedantic and formulaic application of stock forms. Architectural Realism paved the way for the emergence of more strident perspectives on stylistic innovation we now recognize as pre-modernist, such as Jugendstil, Art Nouveau, Stile Liberty and other related stylistic phenomena that predate the rise of Neues Bauen (New Building) in the 1920s.

Lipsius died, aged 61, in Dresden. His friend K. E. O. Fritsch, editor of the Deutsche Bauzeiting and an enormously influential architecture critic, claimed that Lipsius' death might have been hastened by the recognition that his life's work, the Academy, was not going to have the presence he had hoped for; that indeed his critics might have been right all along.

After his death, Lipsius was succeeded as Professor of Architecture at the Academy by Paul Wallot, architect of the newly completed German Reichstag (Berlin, 1882–1894).

== Provisional list of works ==
=== Private commissions ===
- Funerary Chapel for Baroness von Eberstein, Schönefeld (Leipzig), 1855.
- Ernst Keil Residence, Goldschmidtstraße 33 (with Oskar Mothes), Leipzig, 1860–61.
- Frege Residence, Dörrienstrasse, Leipzig, n. d.
- Schloss Wetzelstein for Frege Family, Saalfeld, n. d.
- Mirror Hall in Schützenhaus, Leipzig, 1876.
- Café Felsche (AKA Café Français), Augustusplatz, Leipzig, n. d.
- Schloss Klein-Zschocher for Baron von Tauchnitz, Leipzig, n. d.
- Frege Chapel, Abtnaudorf (Leipzig), 1888–89.
- Mausoleum for Graf von Fabrice, Dresden, 1891–93.
- Restaurant Baarmann, Katharinenstrasse, Leipzig, n .d.

=== Public commissions ===
- Johannis-Hospital, Hospitalstrasse, Leipzig, 1867–72.
- Stock Exchange, Chemnitz, 1864–1867.
- Exhibition Hall, Leipzig Applied Art Exhibition, 1879.
- Royal Art Academy and Exhibition Building, Dresden, 1883–1894 — Now Lipsius-Bau

=== Sacred commissions ===
- Church, Wachau, 1866-7
- Johanniskirche, Gera, n. d.
- Petrikirche (with August Hartel), Schletterplatz, Leipzig, 1877–1885.
- Nathanaelkirche (with August Hartel), Leipzig-Lindenau, 1882–1884.

=== Restoration/preservation work ===
- Hotel Russie, Peterstrasse, Leipzig, n. d.
- Jacobikirche Tower, Ölsnitz i. Vogtland, 1866–68.
- Reconstruction of Borna Parish Church, Borna, 1866–68.
- Reconstruction of Tower at St. Peter's, Bautzen, n. d.
- Reconstruction/Enlargement of Schloss Hohenthal, Püchau, 1873–79.
- Reconstruction of Thomaskirche, Leipzig, 1878–89.
- Protective Porch added to the Goldene Pforte, Freiburg, 1883–89.

=== Competitions ===
- Munich Town Hall, 1866.
- Royal Art Academy Dresden, 1867 (Motto: "D. K. J. K.").
- First Reichstag Competition, Berlin, 1872.
- St. Gertrude's, Hamburg, 1880.
- Second Reichstag Competition (with August Hartel), Berlin, 1882 (Motto: "Das ist's").
