= Leipzig Radio Tower =

Communications tower in Germany

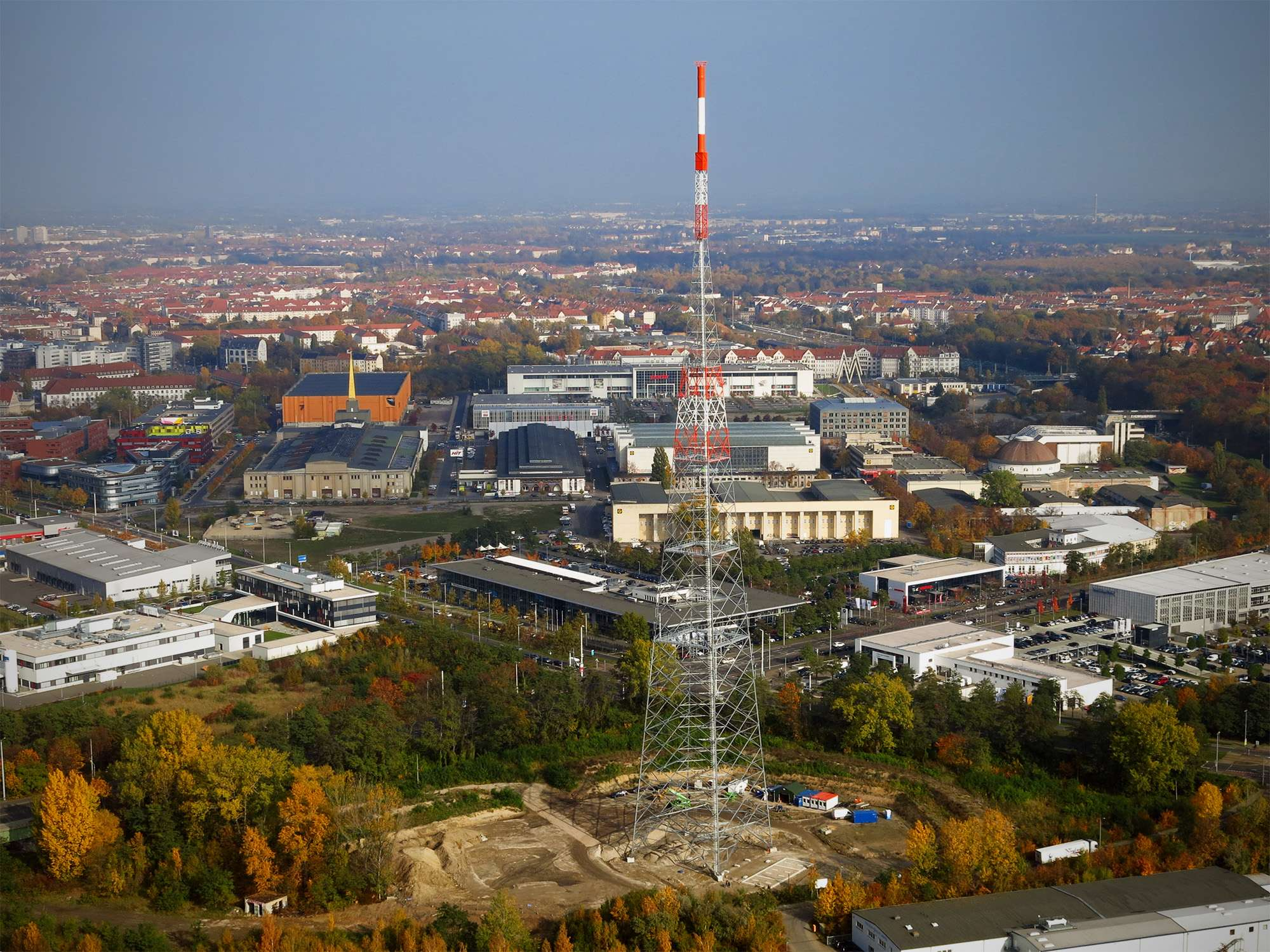
- Aerial view of the tower soon after completion

- Location within Germany

General information
- Status: Completed
- Type: Steel lattice television tower
- Location: Leipzig
- Coordinates: 51°18′49″N 12°23′34″E
- Completed: 2015

Height
- Height: 191 m (627 ft)

Leipzig radio tower is a 191-meter (627 ft) tall lattice tower with a square cross section built in 2015 in Leipzig to broadcast digital terrestrial television (DVB-T2) and digital radio (DAB +) in the Zentrum-Südost district.

== History ==
The Leipzig radio tower is the tallest steel lattice tower in Germany built for radio broadcasting purposes. Nearly all tall broadcast towers in Germany are otherwise built of concrete. The pylons of the Elbe Crossing 2 are significantly taller as was the Königs Wusterhausen Central Tower but it collapsed during a storm in 1972. The structure is the second tallest in the city of Leipzig after the chimney of the steel and cast iron works Bösdorf in Knautnaundorf which is 205 m (627 ft) tall. The tower is located on the corner of Richard-Lehmann and Zwickauer Strasse near the old exhibition grounds and within sight of the Panometer. It was built by the Berlin company Steffens & Nölle GmbH on behalf of Deutsche Funkturm GmbH, a subsidiary of Deutsche Telekom AG. Previously Deutsche Funkturm AG used a 169 m (555 ft) chimney located about 500 meters away to broadcast its signal.

The four foundation blocks, each 25 meters apart, hold 250 cubic meters of concrete. The grid structure made of hot-dip galvanized steel has a mass of 300 tons. The production and delivery of the steel structure was carried out by the Spanish specialist in steel lattice masts Imedexsa. The transmitting antennas are surrounded by a 21-meter-high sheathing made of glass fiber reinforced plastic (GRP) with a lightning basket at its tip.

Up to this height, the tower was assembled with a mobile 1200-tonne large crane, with the individual levels being prefabricated on the ground. On September 28, 2015, work began on placing the subsegments on the tower shaft. The final height without antenna was reached on October 3. On October 26, the 21-meter-high antenna shaft with the lightning basket was assembled in three parts with a Super Puma transport helicopter.

== See also ==
- Lattice tower
