= St. Peter, Leipzig =

Old St. Peter's Church
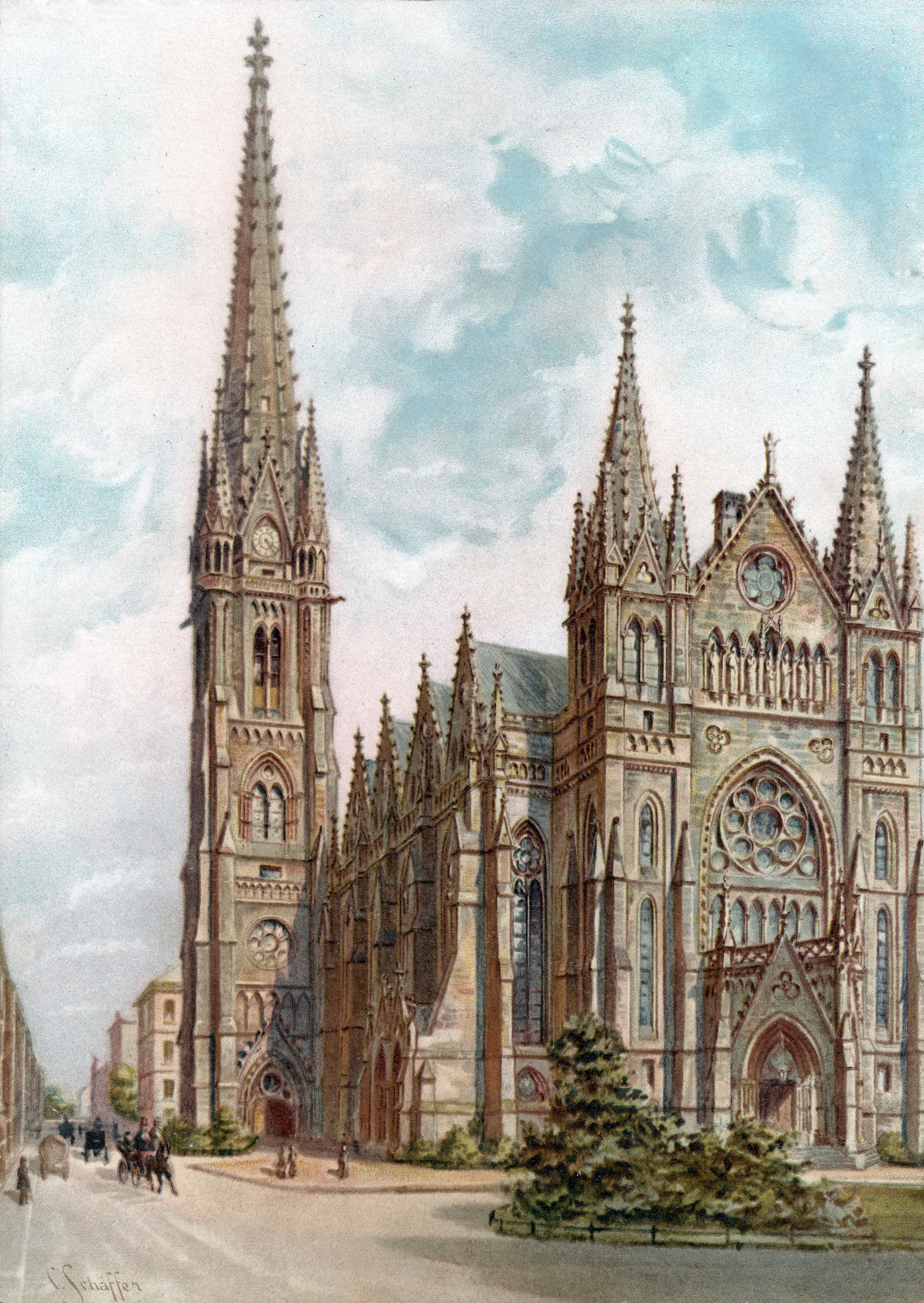
- Peterskirche, a chromolithograph by C. Schäffer, c. 1898
- Old St. Peter's Church
- 51°19′51″N 12°22′33″E
- Location: Leipzig
- Country: Germany
- Denomination: Lutheran
- Website: www.peterskirche-leipzig.de

History
- Consecrated: 27 December 1885

Architecture
- Architects: August Hartel; Constantin Lipsius
- Style: Gothic revival
- Groundbreaking: 17 September 1882

Old St. Peter's Church (German: Alte Peterskirche) is a Lutheran parish and church in the old town of Leipzig, Germany. The present church building, in Gothic Revival style, was erected from 1882 onwards at the Gaudigplatz, and also serves as a concert venue. It replaced a former building at a different location.

The former building was built in 1507. After the Reformation, it was used as a Lutheran church until 1539, and again from 1712 to 1885. It was demolished in 1886. With 87 metres (285 ft) it is Leipzig's tallest church.

== History ==
The Peterskirche, sometimes called Alte Peterskirche (Old St. Peter) to distinguish it from the later building at a different location) was built close to one of the four city gates and adjacent to the wall. The quarter around it was called Petersviertel (St. Peter's quarter). Today's Petersstrasse is reminiscent of that time. The church was dedicated on 29 March 1507. After the Reformation, the church was abandoned in 1539. The building served as storage and during the Thirty Years' War as barracks. In 1704, the minister of St. Thomas's church suggested that the building should be used again for religious purposes. It was rebuilt, including a sacristy and two storeys. The first service was held on 29 May 1712. A new altar and organ were installed from 1797 to 1799. A bell tower was added in 1874.

When the congregation outgrew the old church, minister Gustav Adolf Fricke and the church council decided in 1876 to build a new church. A property at the Schlettenplatz, south of the old city, was exchanged for the property of the old church. Eighty architects from all over Germany responded to a competition in 1877. The designs by August Hartel and Constantin Lipsius were chosen. Construction began in March 1882; the Grundsteinlegung (laying the foundation stone) was celebrated on 17 September that year. It was dedicated on 27 December 1885. The interior painting and stained glass windows were completed in 1886.

The church was damaged during the bombing of Leipzig in World War II; its roof was largely destroyed and was left unrepaired for several years. Restoration was performed during the 1970s and again in the 1990s and 2000s.

== Architecture ==
The church is built in a Gothic Revival style. It has the highest tower of any church in Leipzig, at 87 metres (285 ft). Its exterior is richly decorated, with stained-glass windows and a large portal on the western side.

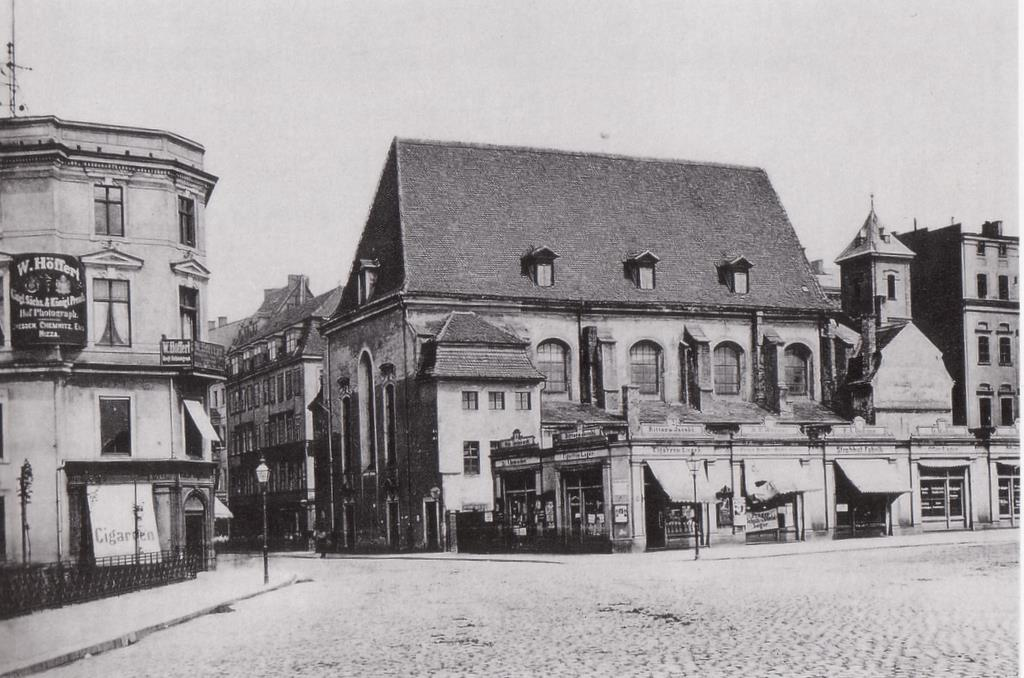
St.Peter in 1880

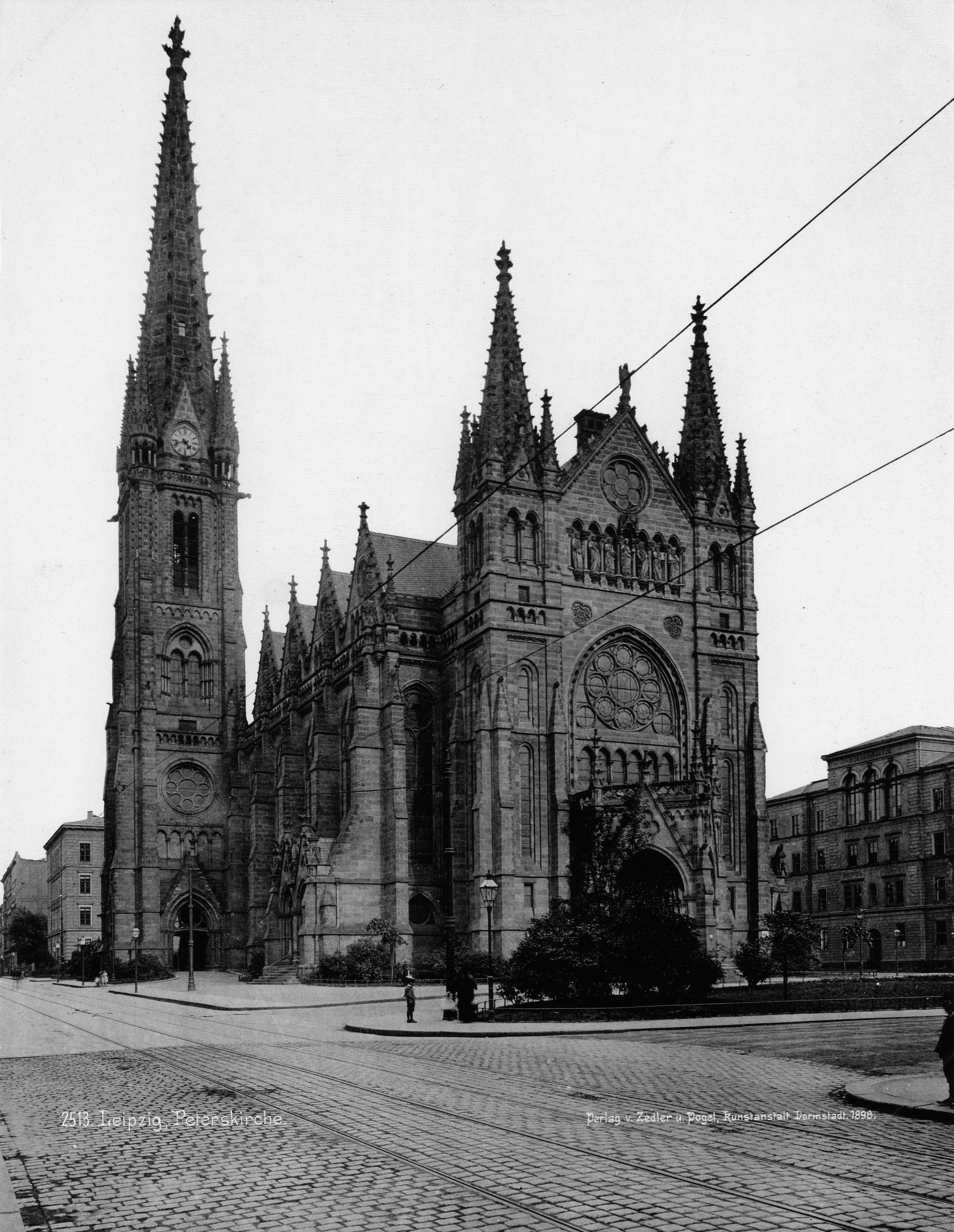
St. Peter in 1898

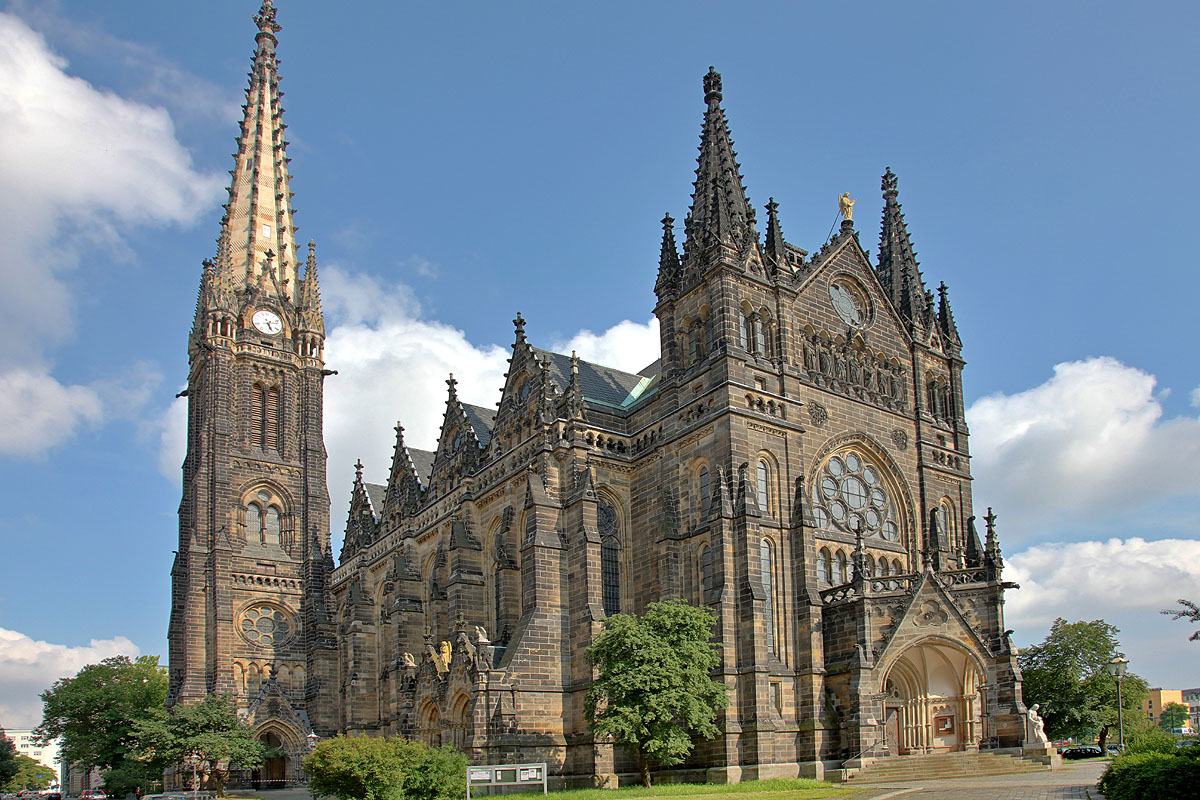
St. Peter in 2009

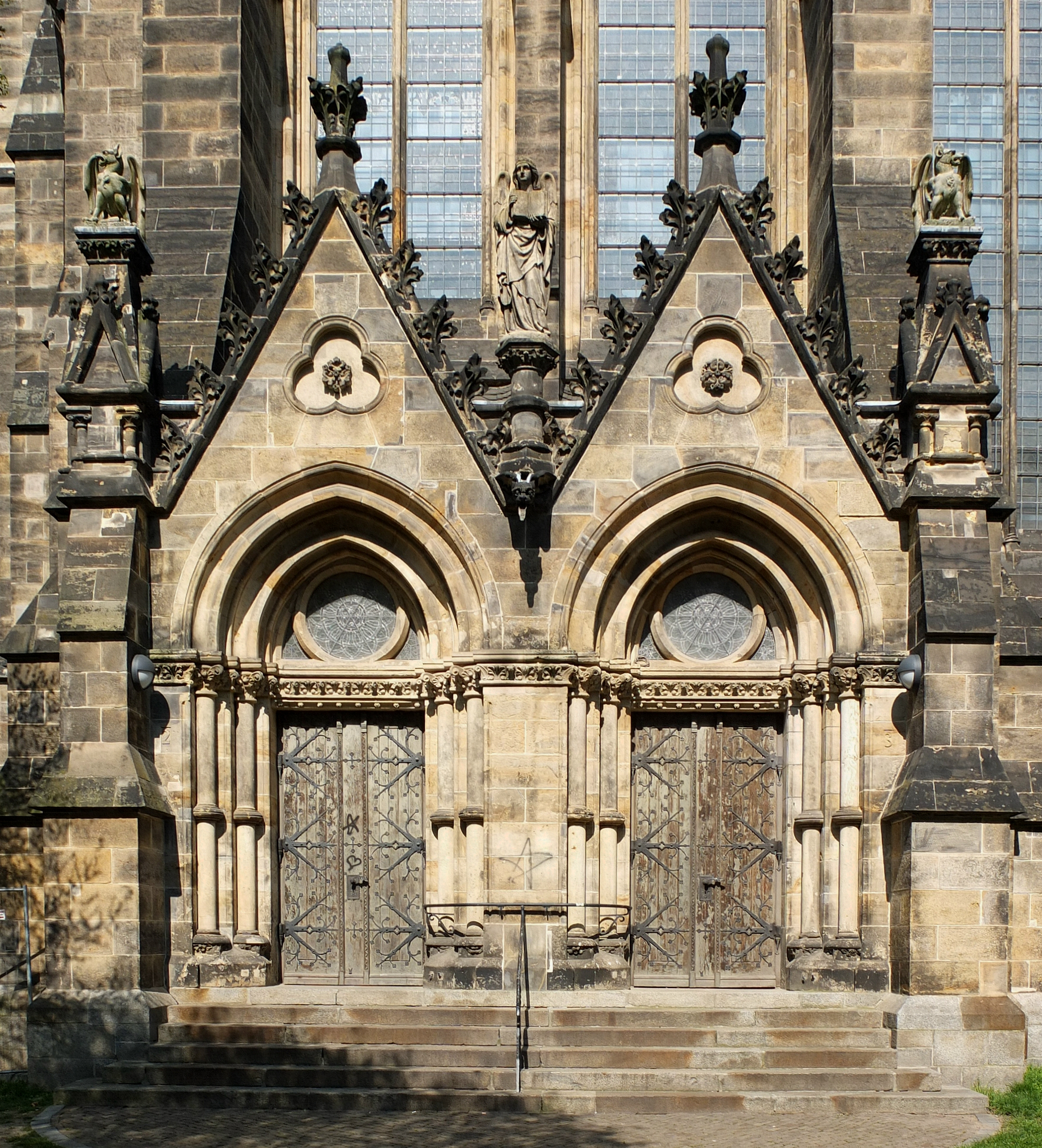
Southern side portal

== Bibliography ==
- "Geschichte". Peterskirche. 2014.
- "Peterskirche, Leipzig". Kidok. 2009.
- Mai, Hartmut (2007). Die Peterskirche in Leipzig (in German). Beucha: Sax-Verlag. ISBN 978-3-930076-33-8.
- Wolff, Christoph (2002). Johann Sebastian Bach: The Learned Musician. W. W. Norton & Company. ISBN 978-0-393-32256-9.
- "Gedenkblätter der Grundsteinlegungs- und Einweihungsfeier für die neue Peterskirche" (in German). Leipzig-Lexikon. 1886.
- "(Alte) Peterskirche" (in German). Leipzig-Lexikon.
- "(Neue) Peterskirche" (in German). Leipzig-Lexikon.
- Cornelius Gurlitt: Peterskirche. In: Beschreibende Darstellung der älteren Bau- und Kunstdenkmäler des Königreichs Sachsen, 17. Volume: Stadt Leipzig (I. Theil). C. C. Meinhold, Dresden, 1895, p. 149.
- Kirchen in Leipzig. Schriften des Leipziger Geschichtsvereins 2/1993. Sax-Verlag, Beucha 1993
- Heinrich Magirius (u.a.). Stadt Leipzig. Die Sakralbauten. Mit einem Überblick über die städtebauliche Entwicklung von den Anfängen bis 1989. Tl. 1. Dt. Kunstverlag, München 1995, pp. 679–697
- Bruno Hartung: Die alte und die neue Peterskirche in Leipzig. Eine Denkschrift. Verlag von Heinrich Matthes (Herm. Voigt), Leipzig. printed by Bär & Hermann in Leipzig 1885.
- Vereinigung Leipziger Architekten und Ingenieure: Die Peterskirche. In: Leipzig und seine Bauten. Zur X. Wanderversammlung des Verbandes Deutscher Architekten- und Ingenieur-Vereine in Leipzig vom 28. bis 31. August, 1892. J.M. Gebhardt's Verlag (Leopold Gebhardt), Leipzig 1892.
