= Otto Paul Burghardt =

German architect (1875–1959)

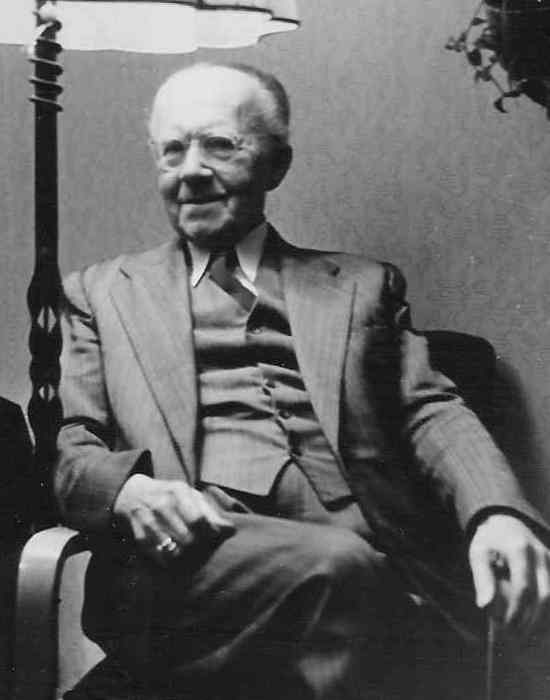
- Otto Paul Burghardt in 1955
- Born: 17 January 1875; Leipzig, Kingdom of Saxony, German Empire
- Died: 29 December 1959 (aged 84); Oldenburg, Germany
- Occupation: Architect
- Buildings: Europahaus, Racecourse Scheibenholz, Romanus House (renovation)

Otto Paul Burghardt (17 January 1875 in Leipzig, Kingdom of Saxony, German Empire – 29 December 1959 in Oldenburg, Germany) was a German architect.

== Biography ==
Burghardt received his Abitur from the Höhere Bürgerschule in Leipzig and then studied at the Technische Lehranstalt. He worked for two years in the studio of the Leipzig architects Georg Weidenbach and Richard Tschammer. He undertook study trips throughout Germany, Switzerland, France, Italy, Austria-Hungary and Czechoslovakia.

From 1 April 1904 he worked as an independent architect in Leipzig. He mainly built historicist buildings in Leipzig, but also the 13-storey-Europahaus.

He is buried on the protestant cemetery in Jever.

== Works ==
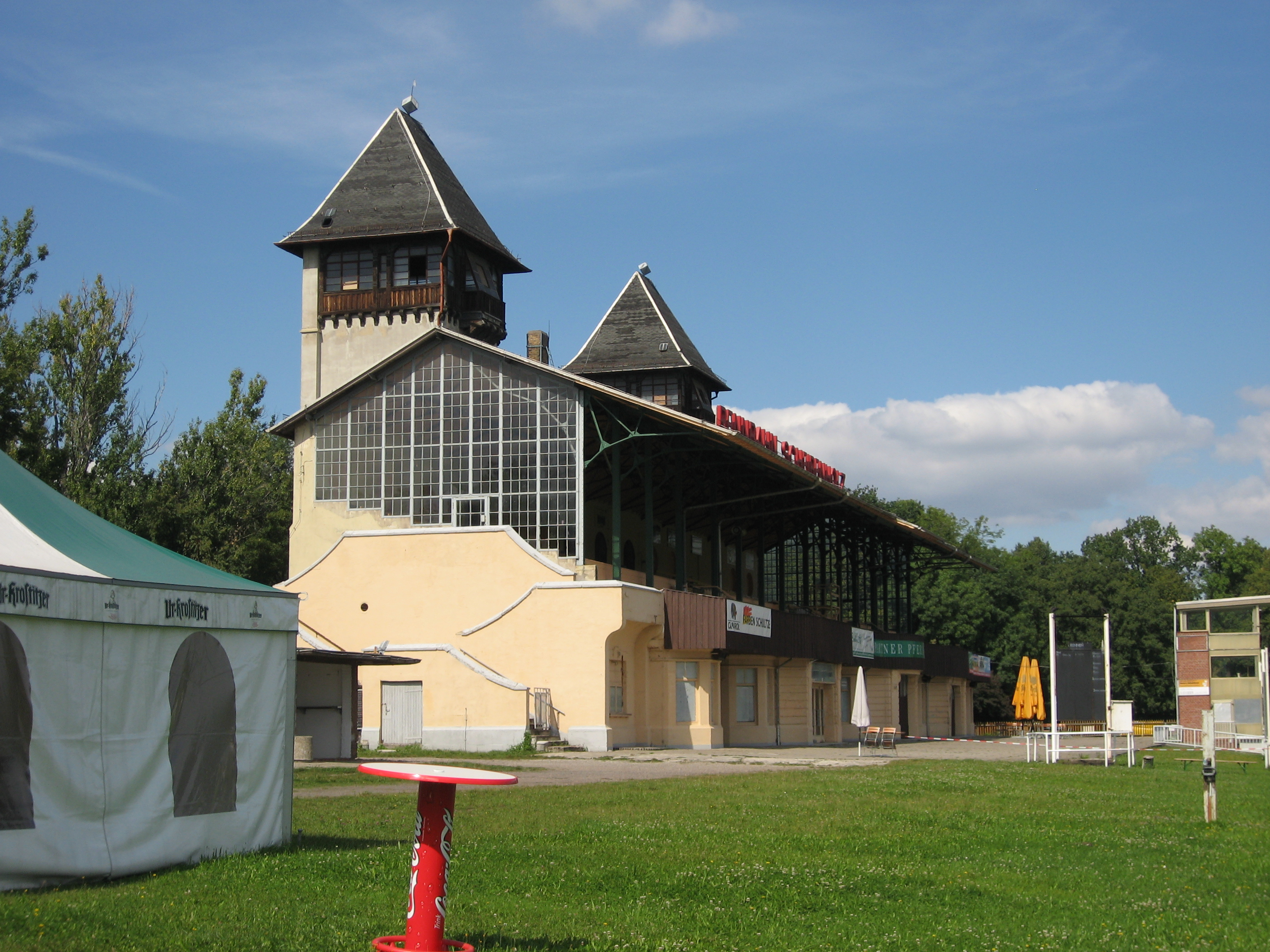
Scheibenholz racecourse grandstand

Burghardt's architecture from the early 20th century is characterized by a modern architecture that, like the architecture of Leipzig before the First World War, is adapted to the historic urban cityscape. His buildings are characterized by a large surface area, by the clear effort to grasp functions and not to obscure the purpose with excessive decoration. However, he still devotes particular attention to ornament, and thus achieves a clearly characteristic autonomy in small details.

In 1906, the Romanus House was sold to the Steinmann brothers. They commissioned a complete renovation by Burghardt, known for his studies of Leipzig's Baroque buildings.

As part of the expansion of the Scheibenholz racecourse, which had existed since 1867, the existing wooden grandstand was to be replaced. Burghardt designed a massive grandstand building with two massive towers and a restaurant.

== Award ==
He received the Gold Medal for his designs exhibited at the 1909 Allgemeine Bauausstellung (General Building Exhibition) in Leipzig.

== See also ==
- List of tallest buildings in Leipzig

== Bibliography ==
- Entry Burghardt, Otto Paul in: Riedel, Horst (2005). Stadtlexikon Leipzig von A bis Z (in German). Leipzig: Pro Leipzig. p. 81. ISBN 3-936508-03-8.
- Entry Otto Paul Burghardt in: Hocquél, Wolfgang (2023). Architekturführer Leipzig. Von der Romanik bis zur Gegenwart (in German). Leipzig: Passage-Verlag. p. 333. ISBN 978-3-95415-128-8.
