= Zentrum-Nordwest =

- Stadtteil of Leipzig
- Interactive map of Zentrum-Nordwest
- Location within Germany Location within Saxony
- Coordinates: 51°20′20″N 12°21′47″E
- Country: Germany
- State: Saxony
- District: Urban district
- City: Leipzig

Area
  - Total: 3.947 km^{2} (1.524 sq mi)

Population (2025-12-31)
  - Total: 11,039
  - Density: 2,797/km^{2} (7,244/sq mi)
- Time zone: UTC+01:00 (CET)
  - Summer (DST): UTC+02:00 (CEST)
- Postal codes: 04105, 04109
- Dialling codes: 0341

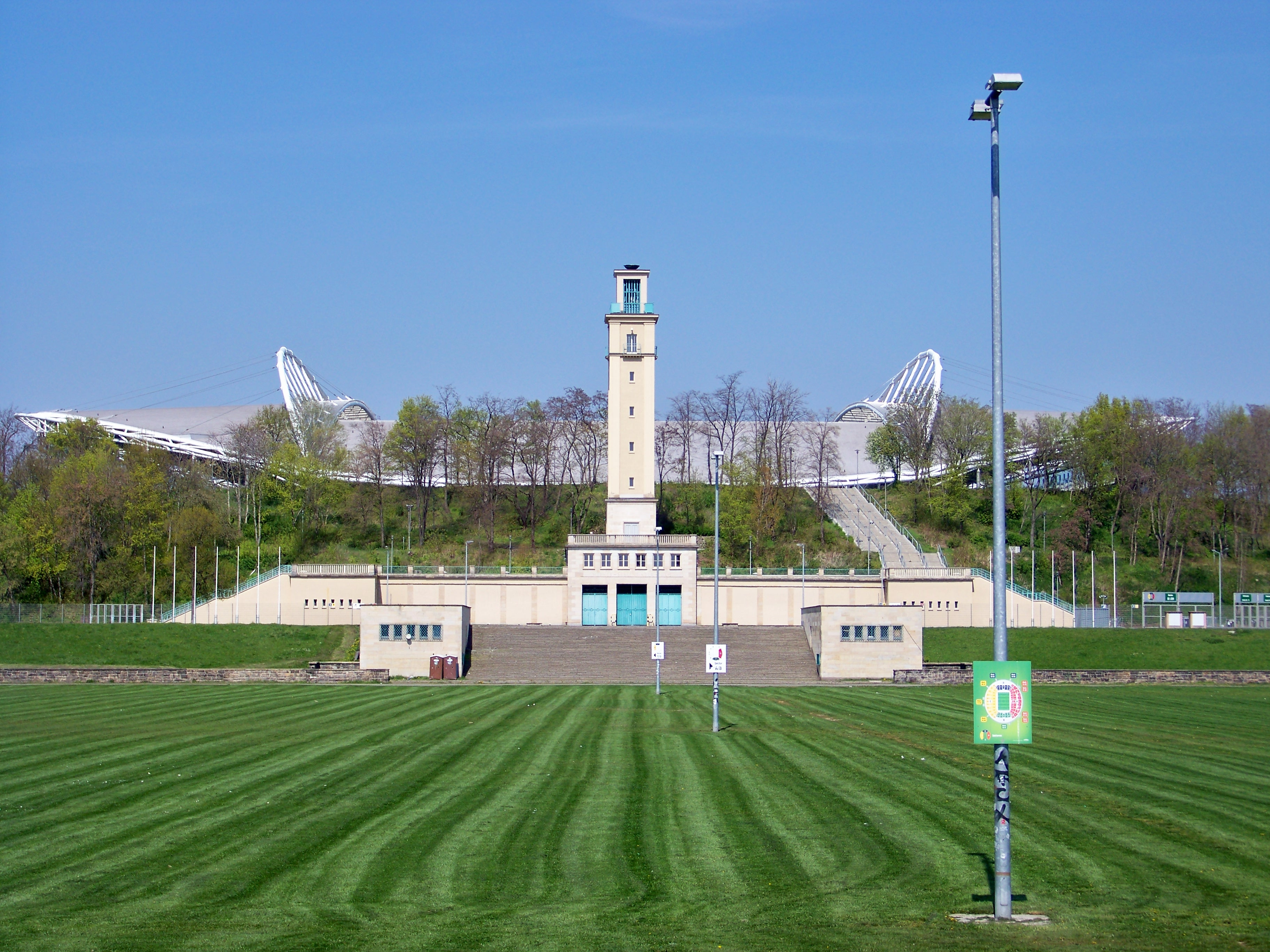
Sportforum with Stadium in the background

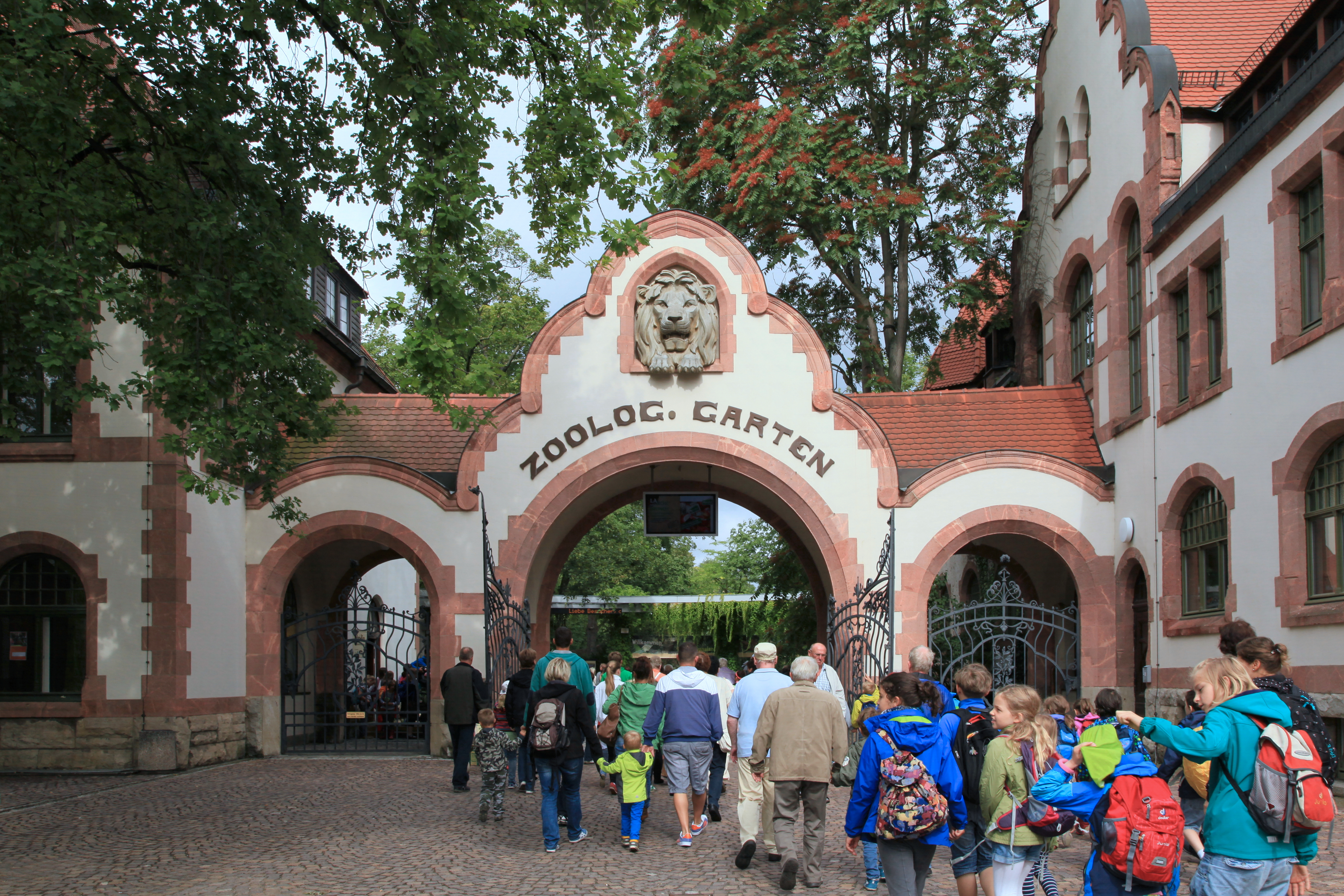
Leipzig Zoological Garden entrance

Zentrum-Nordwest is one of the 63 localities into which Leipzig was administratively divided in 1992. It belongs to the Leipzig borough of Mitte and has the serial number 05. It consists of the Waldstraßenviertel neighbourhood in the east, the area around the Red Bull Arena and Sportforum in the west and the Rosental public park in the north.

== Location ==
The locality of Zentrum-Nordwest is bordered in the south by the street Ranstädter Steinweg - Jahnallee, in the west by the Elster basin and the Nahle river, in the north by the Leipzig–Großkorbetha railway line and in the east by the Parthe, the Kickerlingsberg street and the Pfaffendorfer Strasse. This means that Leipzig Zoo also belongs to the Zentrum-Nordwest locality.

== Location characteristics ==
The locality boundary is drawn in such a way that two thirds of the locality consists of park, meadow and alluvial forest areas. The Parthe, the Rosental and the area around the Elster basin and Nahle are particularly green. The Waldstraßenviertel, on the other hand, is comparatively densely built-up, which is protected as an area monument because of its well-preserved Wilhelminian style substance. Residential and office uses predominate in the Waldstraßenviertel neighbourhood. Business locations are located in particular on Jahnallee and Waldplatz.

The area between the Waldstraßenviertel and the Elster basin is used for sports and events, for example in the Arena Leipzig multifunctional hall and on the festival grounds (Festwiese). In addition to the top-class association football, other sports should also be mentioned, such as the Leipzig Marathon. Far enough away, in the far northwest of the locality, is the Rosental sewage treatment plant as the central sewage treatment plant for Leipzig.

== History ==
Historically, the locality was located in front of the Ranstädt Gate of the Leipzig City Gates. The road leading west from this gate was the only passable route through the frequently flooded "Frankfurter Wiesen" ("Frankfurt meadows" after the name of the road). It was part of the Via Regia. In the Middle Ages, there was a St. James Chapel here, which has not been preserved. The Elstermühlgraben, which also looks back on a long history, runs parallel to it. For many centuries, however, there was only a very selective development in today's locality. In the Battle of Leipzig in 1813, the bridge over the Elstermühlgraben was accidentally blown up, as commemorated by the bridge blasting monument just outside the locality Zentrum-Nordwest.

In the course of the 19th century, gradual flood protection measures were taken, as a result of which the eastern area with today's Waldstraßenviertel could initially be built on. For the western area, there were visionary development proposals from 1870 onwards, but they could not be implemented as long as the Frankfurt meadows were regularly flooded. For example, in 1892 Eduard Hansen proposed the creation of an Inner Elster and Outer Elster based on the Hamburg model of Binnenalster and Außenalster. Much later (on 4 May 1911), the council passed the resolution to plan the Elster basin.

In 1926, the council adopted the general development plan, which was presented by the city planning officer Hubert Ritter and proposed uses such as a stadium and an event venue for this area. However, it took until the post-war period for development to pick up speed and, for example, the Zentralstadion (1956) and the Leipzig Swimming Stadium were built. The construction of the Deutsche Hochschule für Körperkultur (Sport University of East Germany) is also part of it, but its location is already in the adjacent Zentrum-West locality. Despite all the renovations that took place after 1989, the area remained shaped by sports and events. The current framework plan for the stadium surroundings continues to pursue this objective.

== Population ==
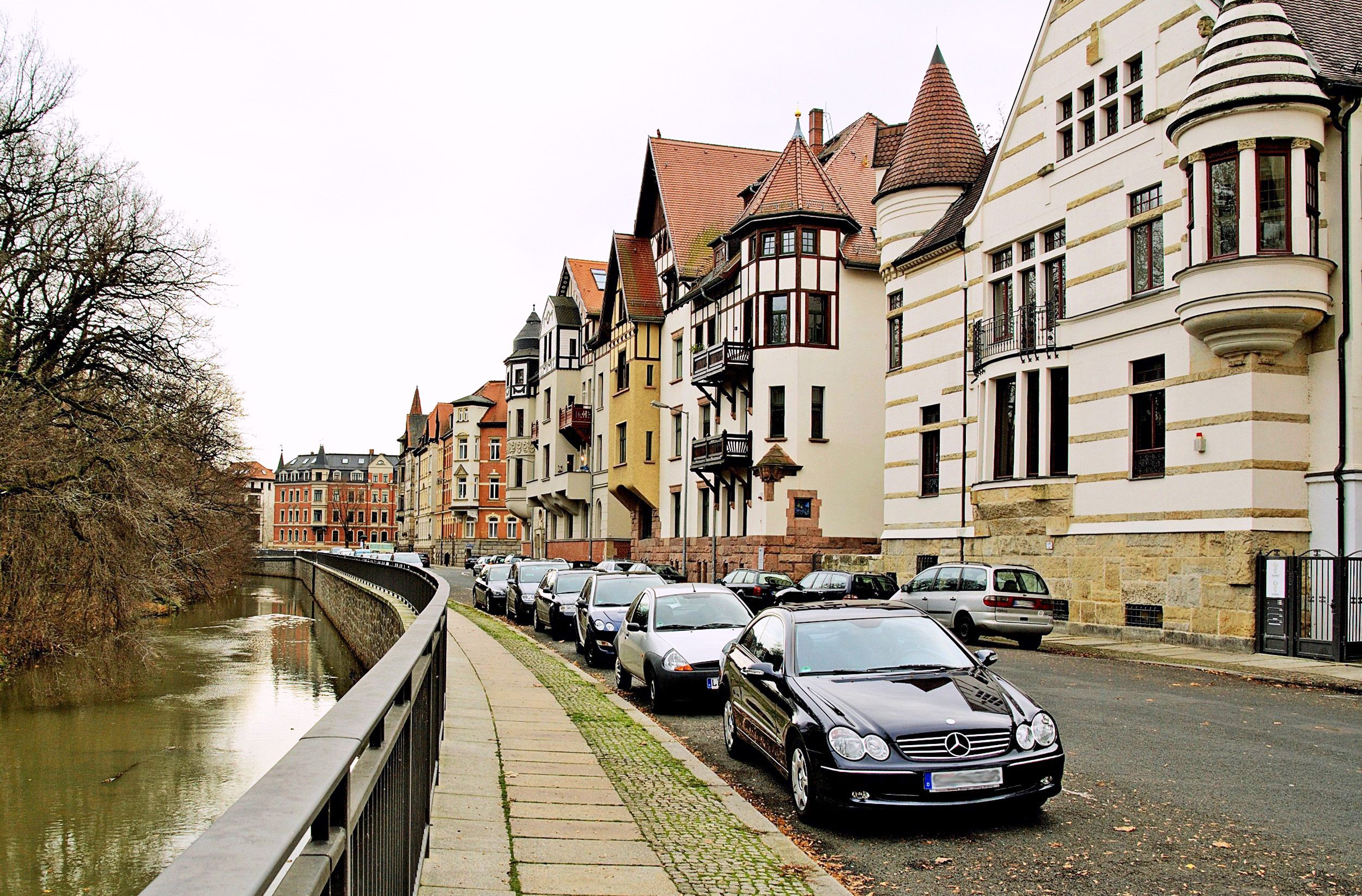
Waldstraßenviertel

The number of inhabitants with their main residence in the Zentrum-Nordwest locality has developed as follows since 1997:

Year	Residents
1997	5,167
2000	6,209
2005	7,793
2010	9,423
2015	10,354
2020	10,677
2025	11,039

== Politics ==
The 2025 German federal election had the following result after second votes in the Zentrum-Nordwest locality with a voter turnout of 89.6%:

Party	Zentrum-Nordwest	all over Leipzig
SPD	13.1%	10.7%
Bündnis 90/Die Grünen	25.1%	13.6%
Die Linke	17.6%	22.5%
AfD	11.2%	21.9%
CDU	19.4%	16.6%
FDP	5.1 %	3.2 %
BSW	5.4 %	7.4 %
Others	3.1 %	4.1 %

In elections to the Landtag of Saxony, Zentrum-Nordwest belongs to the Leipzig 5 constituency.

== See also ==
- Waldstraßenviertel
- Rosental
- Zoo Leipzig
