= Nordfriedhof (Leipzig) =

Cemetery in Leipzig, Germany

Coordinates: 51.362°N 12.397°E

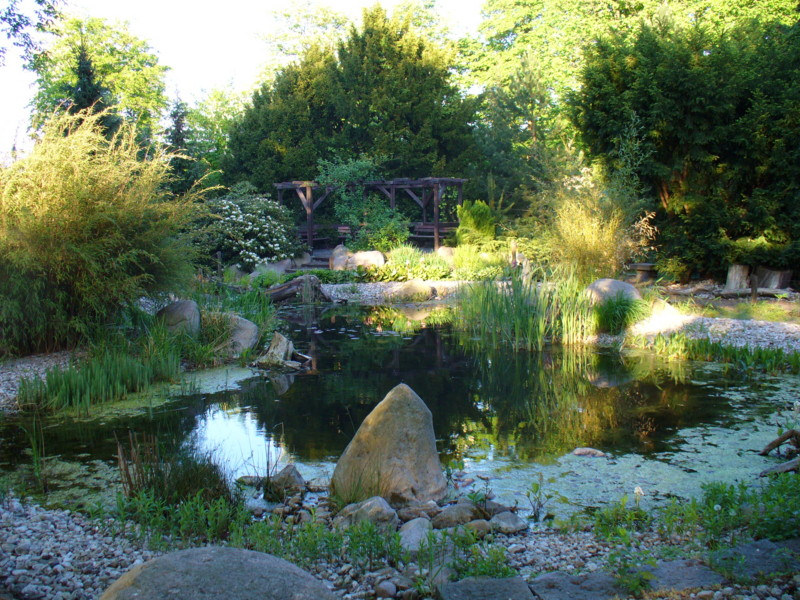
Wetland environment, Nordfriedhof, Leipzig

The Nordfriedhof ("North Cemetery") is a public cemetery run by the city of Leipzig, located at Berliner Straße 125–127 in the district of Eutritzsch between Hamburger Straße, Theresienstraße and Maximilianallee, directly adjoining the smaller Old Jewish Burial Ground ("Alter Israelitischer Friedhof").

== History ==
The Nordfriedhof was opened on 24 May 1881. In comparison to the largest burial ground in the city, the Südfriedhof, which covers 82 hectares, the Nordfriedhof has less than a tenth of the area, at 7.3 hectares. Nevertheless in terms of landscaping, ecology and tree-planting it is extremely varied, and has, for example, an area of wetland, set up after the year 2000.

The cemetery buildings date from the years 1905–1910. Otto Brückwald constructed a complex based on Italian models with leafy wooden arcades connecting the chapel, the mortuary and the administrative buildings. The chapel was destroyed during the air raids of 4 December 1943. To the left of the entrance is the former house of the keeper, also designed by Brückwald. The grounds were landscaped by Otto Wittenberg in the traditional style, with regular and strongly symmetrical fields of graves. He did not produce a park cemetery of the new type until 1886, when the Südfriedhof was opened. In the Nordfriedhof there were no ornamental areas, except for some colourful flowerbeds in front of main entrance on the Berliner Straße.

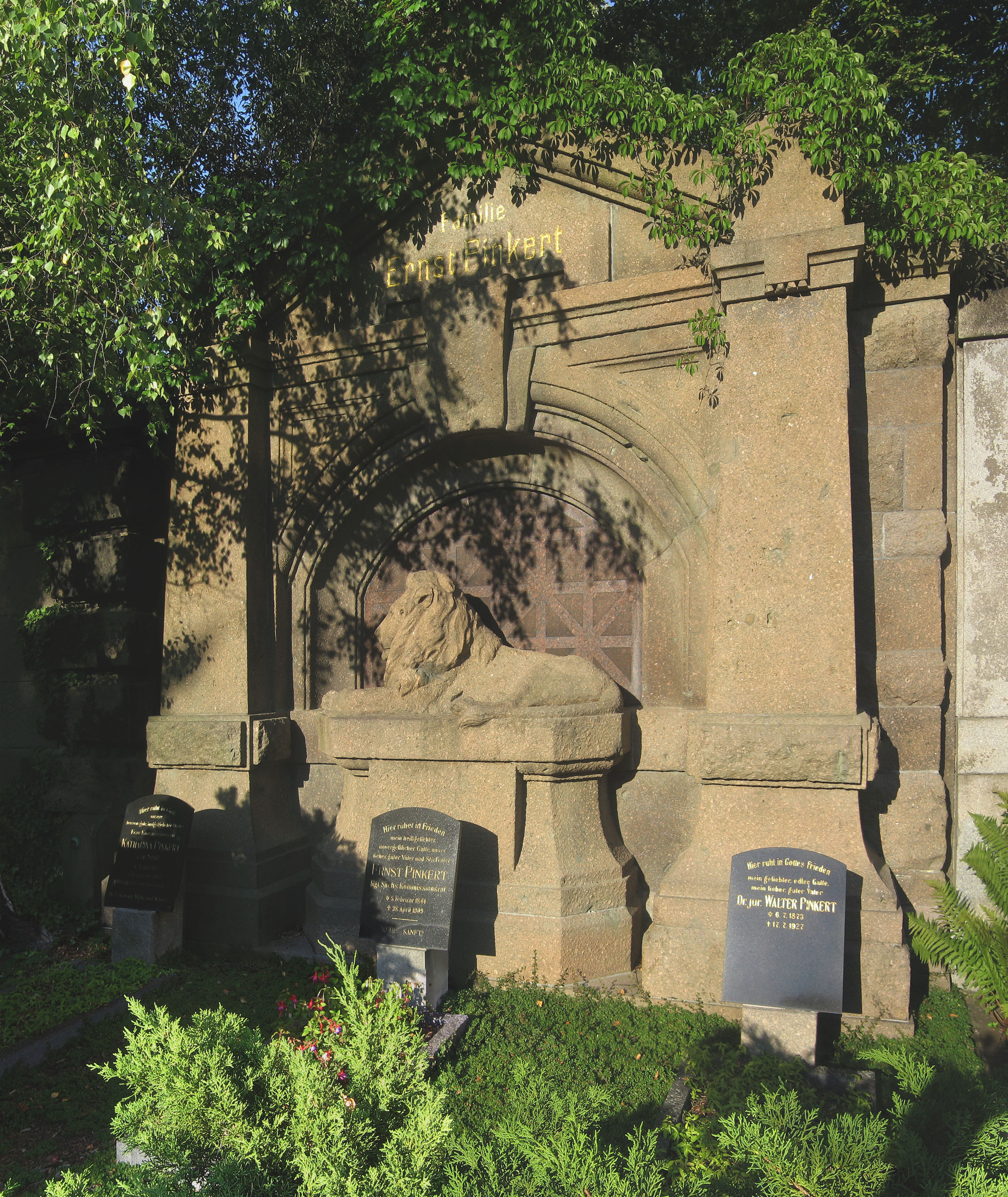
Monument of Ernst Pinkert, founder of Leipzig Zoo (with lion)

Two Citizens of Honour (Ehrenbürger) of the city of Leipzig are buried here, Senior Imperial Counsel Hermann Tessendorf and the President of the Imperial Court Rudolf von Seckendorff. Further notable individuals buried here are Ernst Arthur Seemann, founder of the publishing house E. A. Seemann, (Note: On this publishing company, see: Tebbel, J.W. (1981). The great change, 1940–1980. A History of Book Publishing in the United States. R. R. Bowker Company. p. 676. ISBN 978-0-8352-0499-6.; Links, C. (2013). Das Schicksal der DDR-Verlage: Die Privatisierung und ihre Konsequenzen [The fate of publishers in East Germany: Privatization and its consequences]. DDR-Geschichte (in German). Ch. Links. p. 160. ISBN 978-3-86284-256-8.; Knopf, Sabine (2011). Buchstadt Leipzig: der historische Reiseführer (in German). Links. p. 14. ISBN 978-3-86153-634-5.) the book publisher and dealer Carl Christian Philipp Tauchnitz, the urologist Arthur Kollmann, and Ernst Pinkert, founder of Leipzig Zoo.

Also in the Nordfriedhof is one of the oldest monuments to the Battle of Leipzig (1813). After a mass grave of the fallen of the battle was discovered in 1892 in the Eutritzscher Straße, the Leipzig Historical Union commissioned a gravestone from the architect Franz Drechsler. The monument, opposite the former Theresienstraße entrance, was dedicated on 18 October 1899, and consists of an unworked block of stone with the inscription "Freund und Feind im Tod vereint" ("Friend and foe united in death") and a smaller rectangular stone block behind the memorial stone.

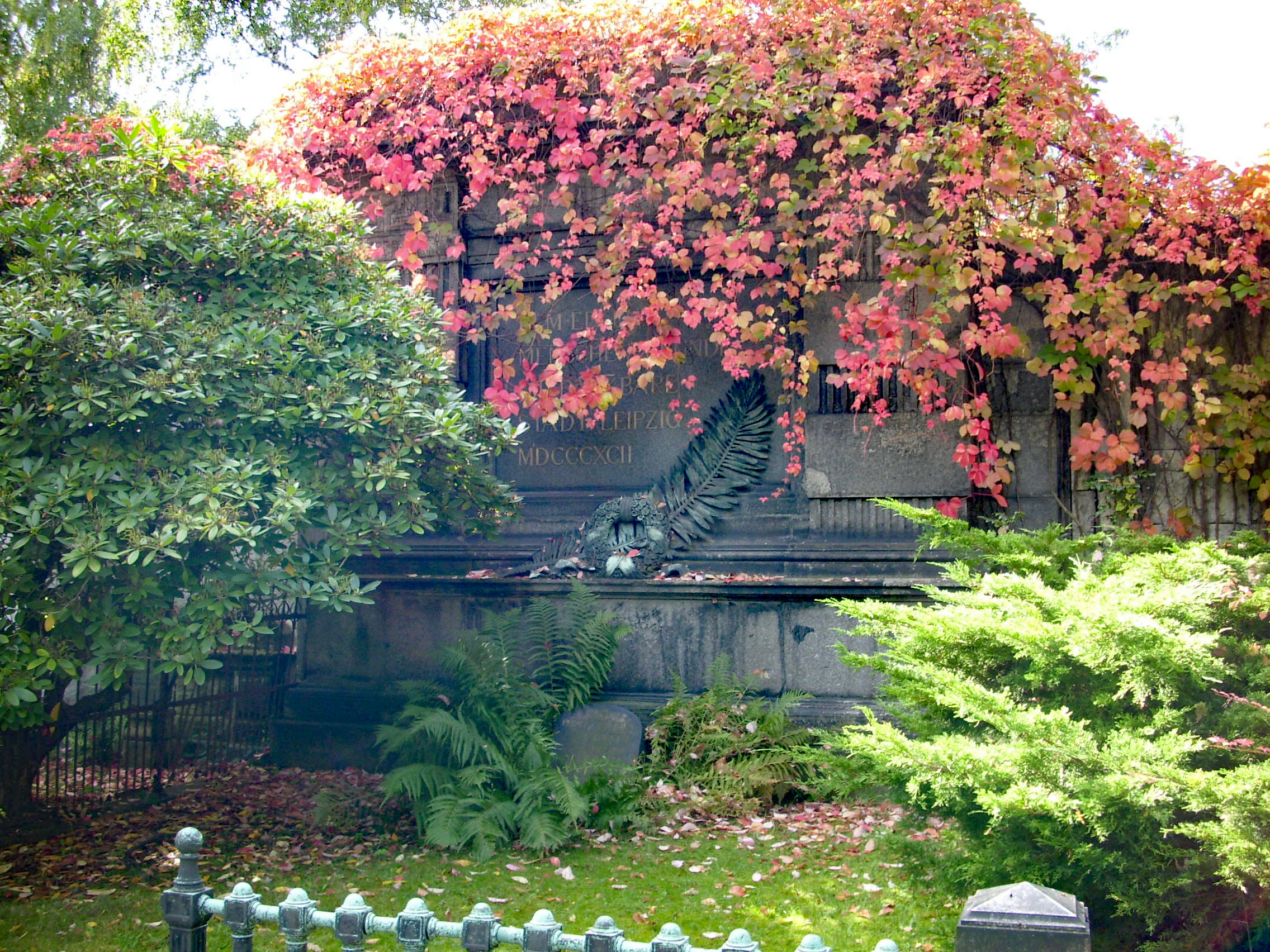
Grave of C C P Tauchnitz

In April 2005, human remains were interred at the Nordfriedhof which likely originate from the cemetery of the St. James parish (Jacobsparochie)—founded around 1200—which was secularized in 1544. The remains were discovered during construction work for the new course of the Elstermühlgraben canal at Ranstädter Steinweg.

== Literature ==
- Der Friedhofswegweiser. Diesseits und jenseits. Stadt Leipzig (pp. 32–39). Leipzig: Mammut-Verlag 2005
