= Hermann Klaatsch =

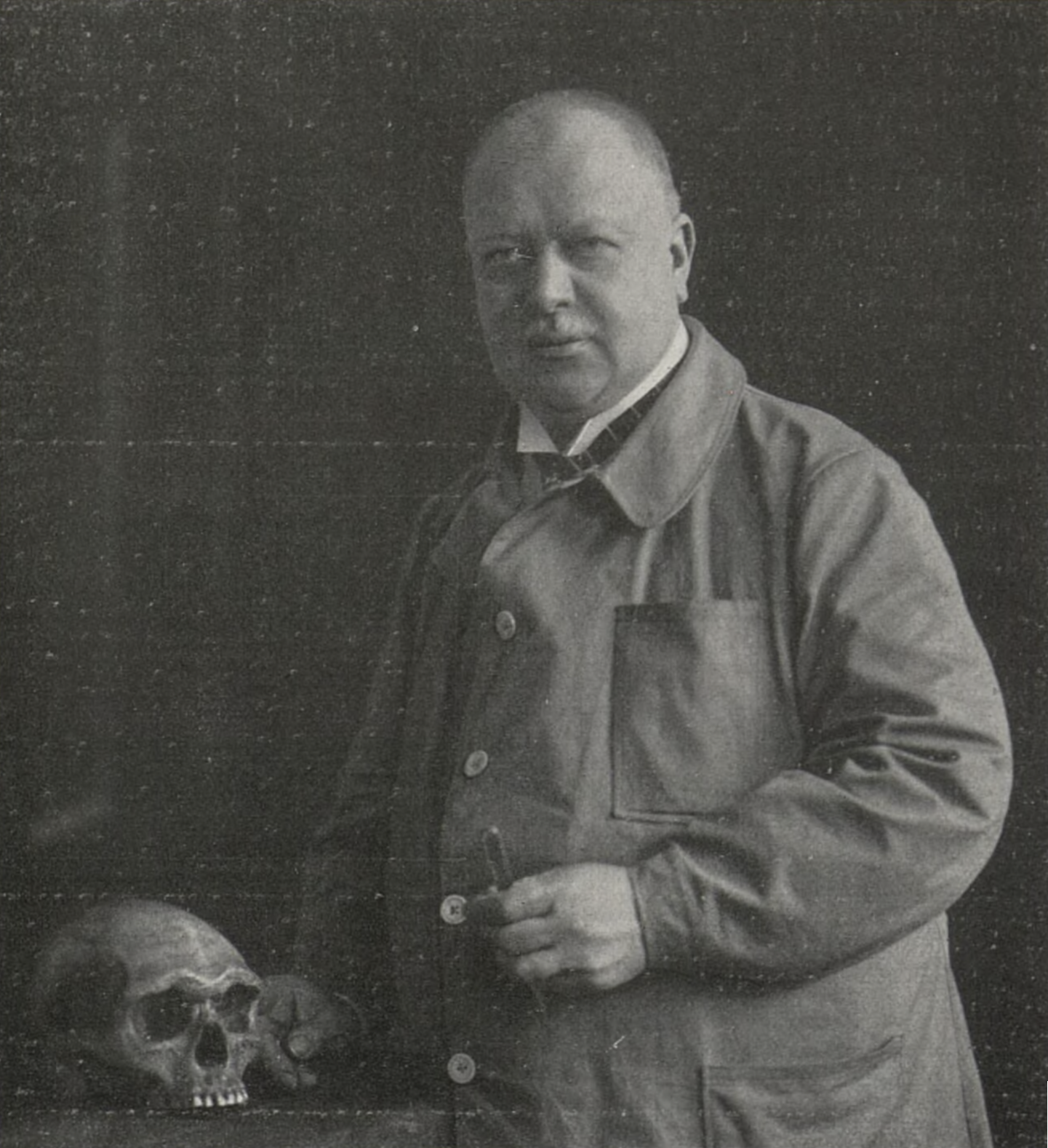
Hermann Klaatsch (c. 1915)

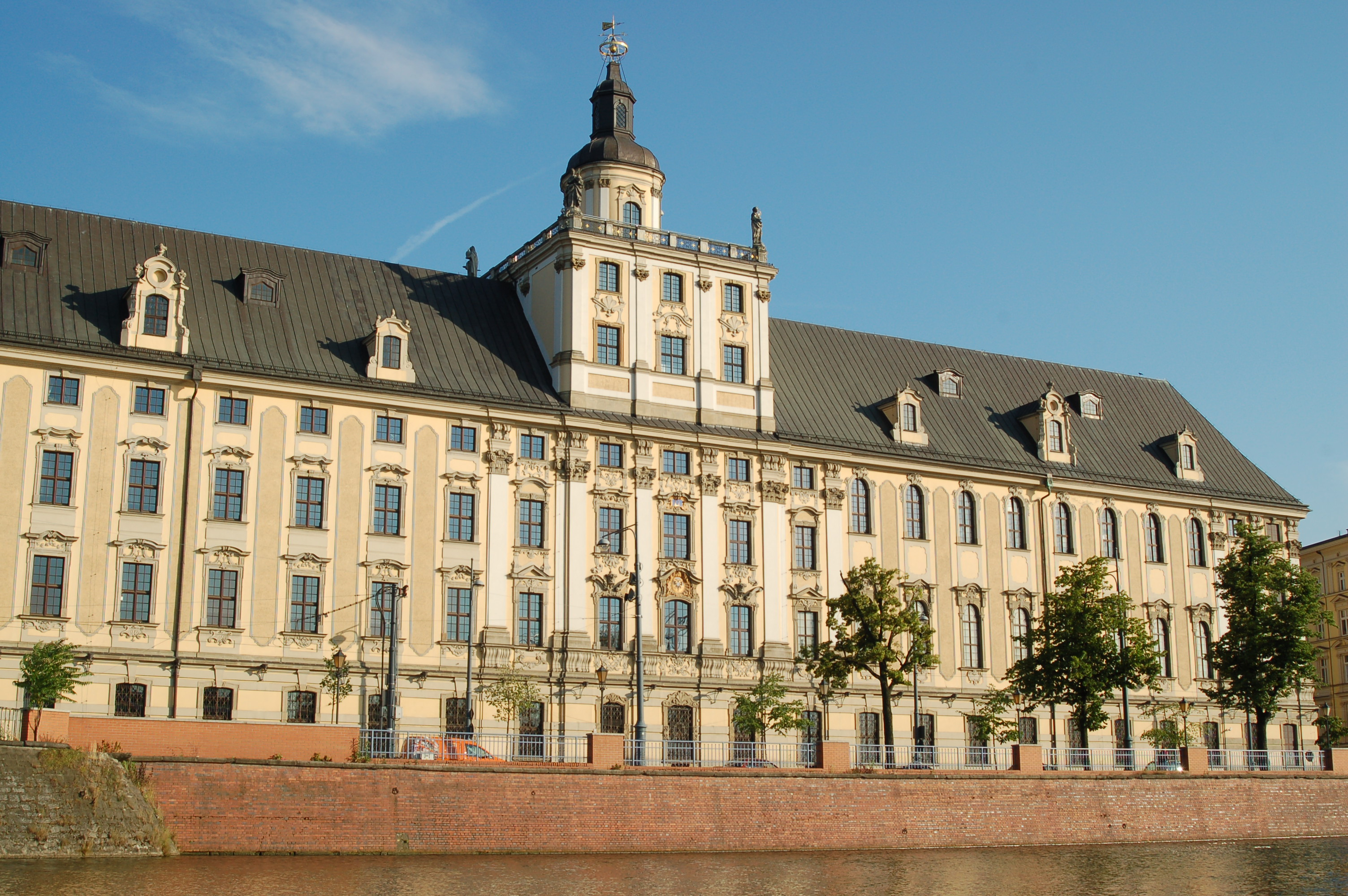
Klaatsch taught anatomy and anthropology at Breslau (University of Wrocław).

Hermann Klaatsch (10 March 1863 – 5 January 1916) was a German physician, anatomist, physical anthropologist, evolutionist, and professor at the University of Heidelberg from 1890, and at the University of Breslau (Wrocław) until 1916.

Klaatsch studied evolutionary theory, being mentioned in some fingerprint books for his early studies on friction skin development. He researched the volar pads associated with the epidermal patterns, grouping the volar pads of humans and primates together. Subsequent to Arthur Kollmann, Klaatsch also gave names to the various volar pads in 1888.

Klaatsch made many discoveries and advocated separating anthropology from religion.

== Life and work ==
Klaatsch was born in Berlin. His father was a physician, and Hermann showed an interest in collecting specimens and in the natural sciences while a boy. He graduated from Royal Wilhelms-Gymnasium in 1881 and went to the University of Heidelberg to study medicine, and biology. He later went on to study at the University of Berlin and at the biological station of Villefranche.

Klaatsch began working at the Rudolf Virchow laboratory and at the Augusta Hospital. In 1885, he became a scientific assistant at the anatomical institute under Heinrich Wilhelm Gottfried von Waldeyer-Hartz, and received an M.D.

In 1888, Klaatsch received a personal invitation to the University of Heidelberg from the old college friend who had first interested him in anatomy. In 1890 Klaatsch began teaching there.

Between 1904 and 1907, Klaatsch traveled into Australia and Java to study the native peoples. He later published papers on his findings.

=== Time in Australia ===
In Queensland, his principal contact was Walter Roth; after spending some time examining Roth's private collections in Brisbane, in June 1904 Klaatsch travelled north to Newellton, near Cairns, where he stayed as the guest of F.E. Clotten of the Lancelot Tin Mining Company. Near here he was shown Aboriginal camp sites in rockshelters, first saw Aboriginal rock art, and collected stone tools. Later he spent time on Melville Island.

Klaatsch has a notorious connection with North Queensland for having returned to the Upper Russell River at the end of 1904 where he acquired the mummified body of the 'King of Bellenden Ker', which he sent to Berlin. Herman Klaatsch was renowned for digging up indigenous Aboriginal graves for his own collection. Historical evidence shows indigenous peoples opposed the removal of human remains and that there would be dire consequences for doing so. He dug up a grave at night time and reported that his assistant had later been killed because of it, and was also chased away from the Normanton area by people calling him ‘devil devil’ because of his grave robbing activities.

=== Return to Breslau ===
When he returned from his journey, Klaatsch began teaching anatomy and anthropology at the University of Breslau. In 1912 he developed a course in topographic anatomy. During his time at Breslau, Oetteking described Klaatsch's other accomplishments: "Besides his professorship at the University, Klaatsch held several honorary offices, academic and governmental, and his government honored him by bestowing upon him several orders."

Klaatsch frequently attended congresses of anthropologists and anatomists, speaking at nearly every meeting, such as at Cologne in 1910, or Heilbronn in 1911.

Klaatsch also wrote many published papers, all published in his native German. The most important papers he wrote compared similarities of the Aborigines and the neandertaloids bone structures. He also wrote about the skeletal remains in southern France in 1913.

Klaatsch's most important contribution was very controversial. According to Oetteking, "Klaatsch was one of the first to advocate energetically a clear division of religion and science." Oetteking added, "It may be difficult for us… to realize that a conception of anthropology raising it to the level of an academic science dates back not even a generation (in 1916), and is due to spirits of Klaatsch's type."

Klaatsch changed the way anthropology was taught. His life revolved around anatomy and anthropology. He made many important discoveries and changed the way people looked at anthropology.

A long-term professor of anatomy and physical anthropology, Hermann Klaatsch died unexpectedly in Eisenach in 1916. His major work was assembled posthumously by his colleagues.
