= Waldstraßenviertel =

Neighbourhood of Leipzig, Germany

Coordinates: 51.349189°N 12.355175°E

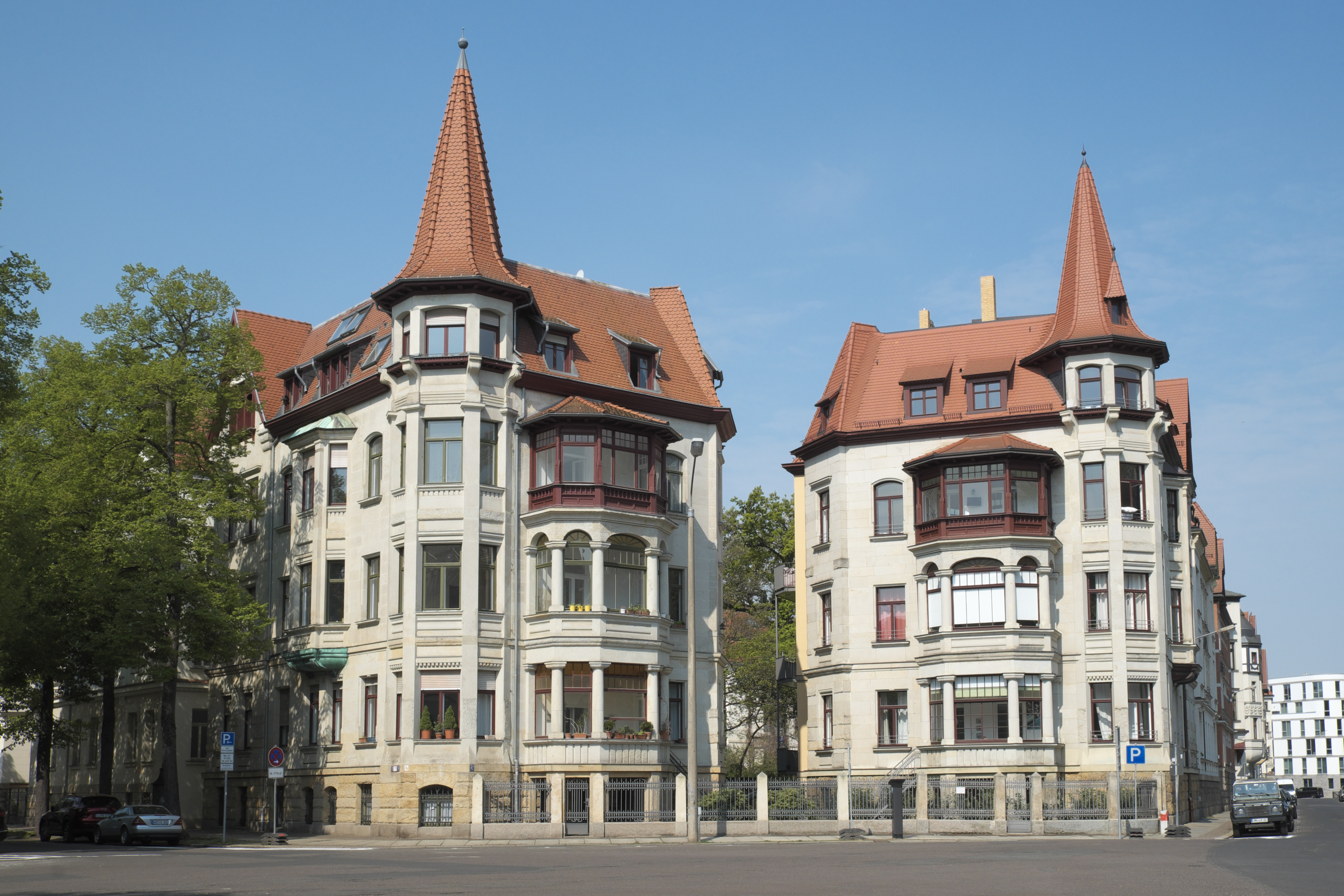
Traffic calming on Liviaplatz in the Waldstrasse neighbourhood (2022)

Waldstraßenviertel (German pronunciation: [ˈvaltʃtʁaːsn̩ˌfɪʁtl̩], "Forest Street Quarter/Neighbourhood") is a neighbourhood in the north west of Leipzig's borough Mitte in Saxony, Germany. It is considered one of the largest complete areas of Gründerzeit buildings in Europe and is therefore considered of important cultural and heritage status. Many of its buildings are therefore protected or listed.

== Statistics ==
The neighbourhood Waldstrassenviertel is part of the Zentrum-Nordwest locality. It covers an area of 396 ha (978.5 acres).

== History ==
Originally this area was forest and grassland. Slavic settlements probably arose very early in the Elster and Pleisse areas. The Via Regia, along today's Ranstädter Steinweg and Jahnallee, was an old trade route that was protected by royal privileges. Hiberno-Scottish missionaries used the Via Regia as early as the 7th century and founded the St. Jacob's Chapel, the first chapel in what later became the city of Leipzig.

In the period from the 10th to the 12th century, numerous river regulation measures took place, for example the Elstermühlgraben (Elster mill ditch) was built and the Parthe was moved to the north. This made further settlement of the area possible.

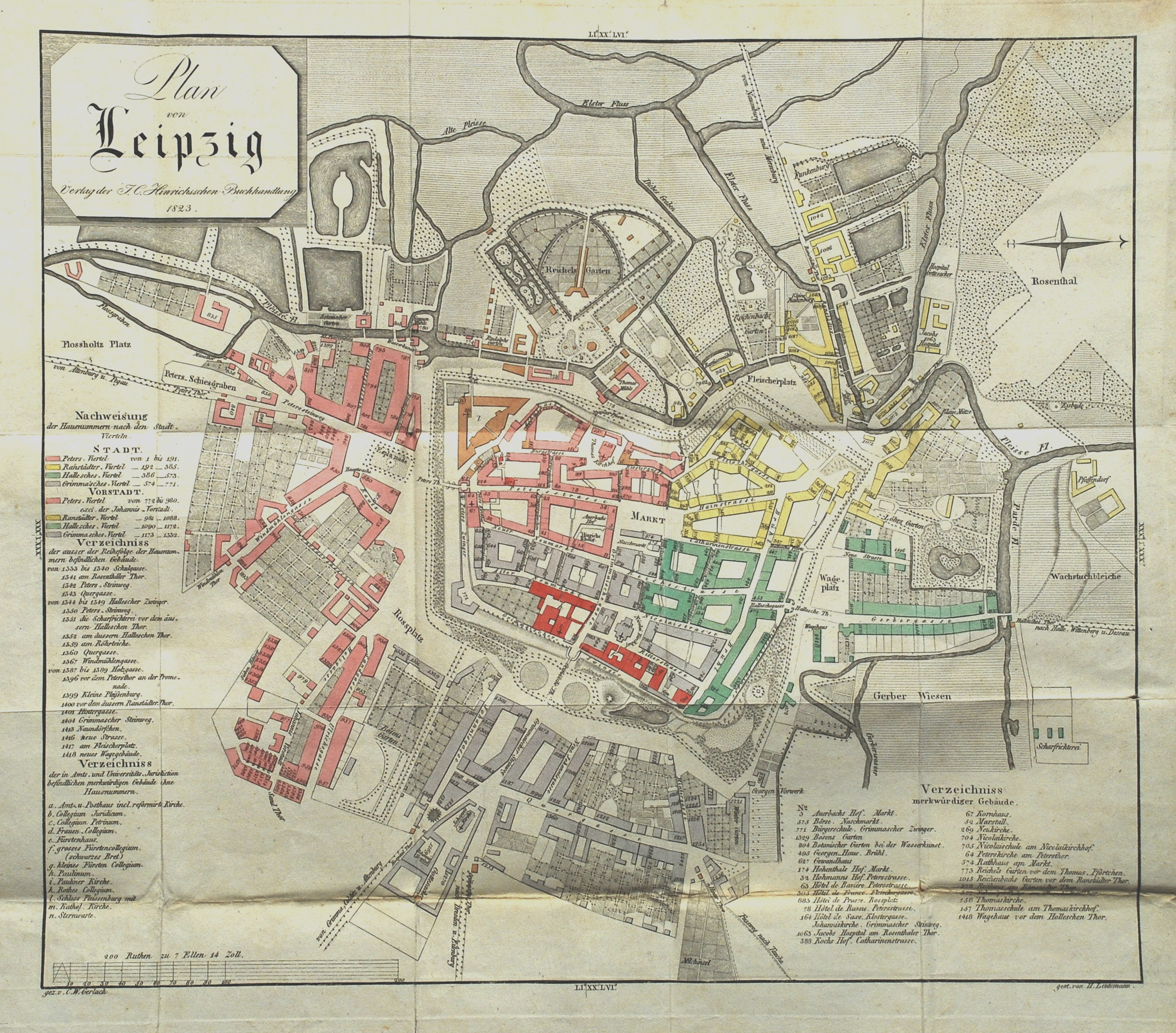
West-oriented map of Leipzig in 1823. Ranstädter Vorstadt (including Jacobs Hospital and Funkenburg) is the yellow area outside the core city, on the upper right side.

As early as the Middle Ages, the Via Regia was lined with two rows of houses on the Ranstädter Steinweg, the Mühlgrabensiedlung (mill ditch settlement) was built to the north and the Jacobsviertel or St. Jacob parish to the south next to the St. Jacob's Chapel. Another small settlement of fishermen named The Naundörfchen was located south of the Jacobsviertel and was first mentioned in a document in 1295.

From these settlements, the Ranstädter Vorstadt or Rannische Vorstadt emerged in the 12th century, which was closed off at the level of the current Leibnizstrasse by the Outer Ranstädt Gate. Because of the two mill ditches, butchers, tanners, dyers and fishermen lived in the Rannische Vorstadt.

The Jacobsmühle (Jacob's Mill, later Angermühle) stood near the St. Jacob's Chapel. To the north of it, the Hospital St. Georg (1212-1631) was built between Elstermühlgraben and Pleisse on the edge of the Rosental in 1212 at the behest of Theodoric I, Margrave of Meissen.

Outside the Outer Rannish Gate, north of the Via Regia, was the Leipzig Council Brickworks. In the area of today's Funkenburgstrasse, a large folwark, the Große Funkenburg, was built around the year 1600 with a large garden, two lakes and several outbuildings. It served, among other things, as a restaurant and was a popular Leipzig excursion destination.

Around 1830, the city's population grew rapidly again, so that further development in the Waldstrasse district became necessary. However, the annual spring floods made this almost impossible and construction could only begin after further regulatory measures.

From around 1830, the Lortzingstrasse/Rosentalgasse area emerged from the buildings that still exist today. This was followed from around 1860 by the Leibnizstrasse area, the Waldplatz and the southern part of the Waldstrasse with its side streets up to Fregestrasse.

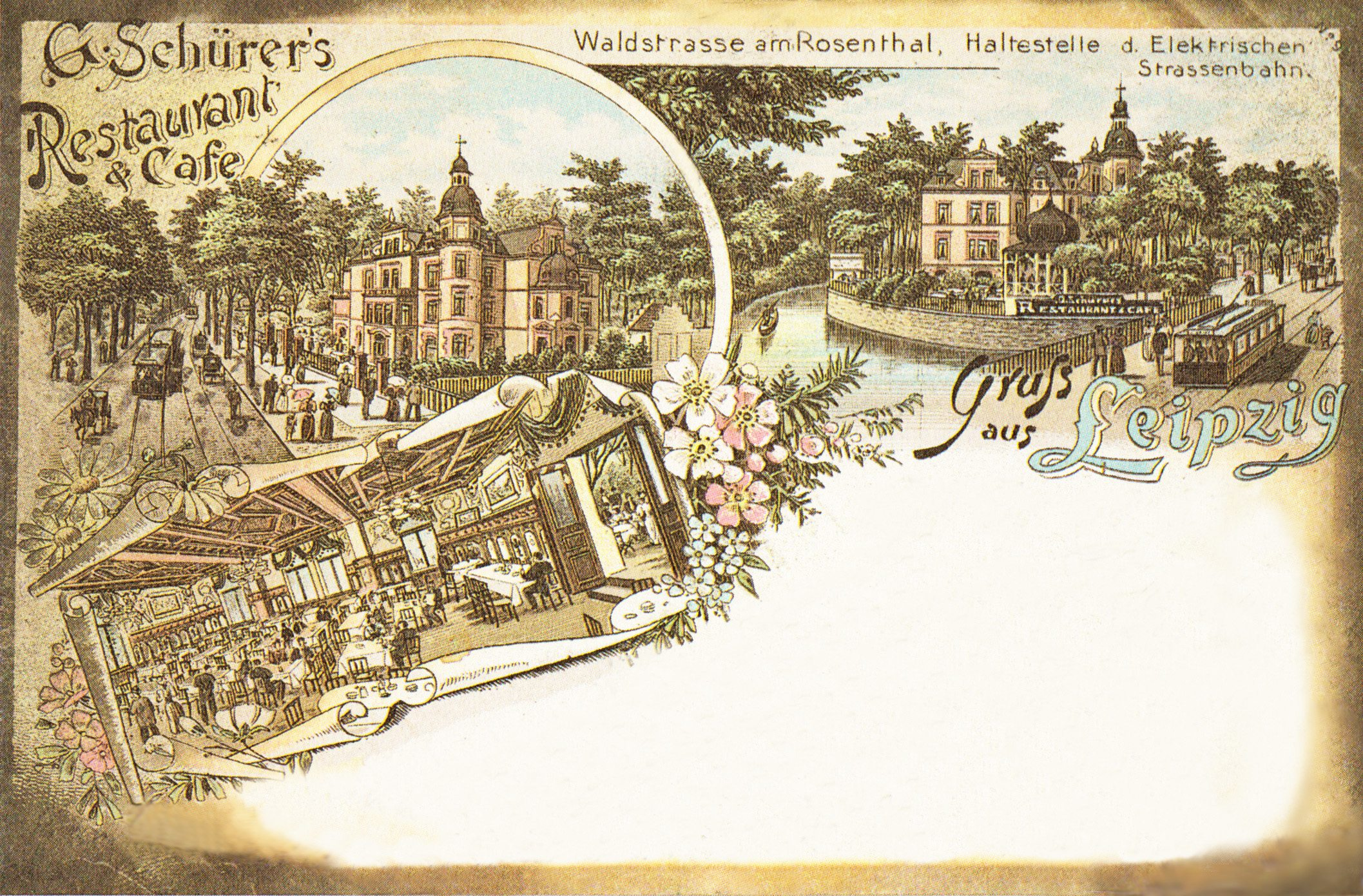
Mückenschlösschen (Mosquito castle) on Waldstrasse, around 1900

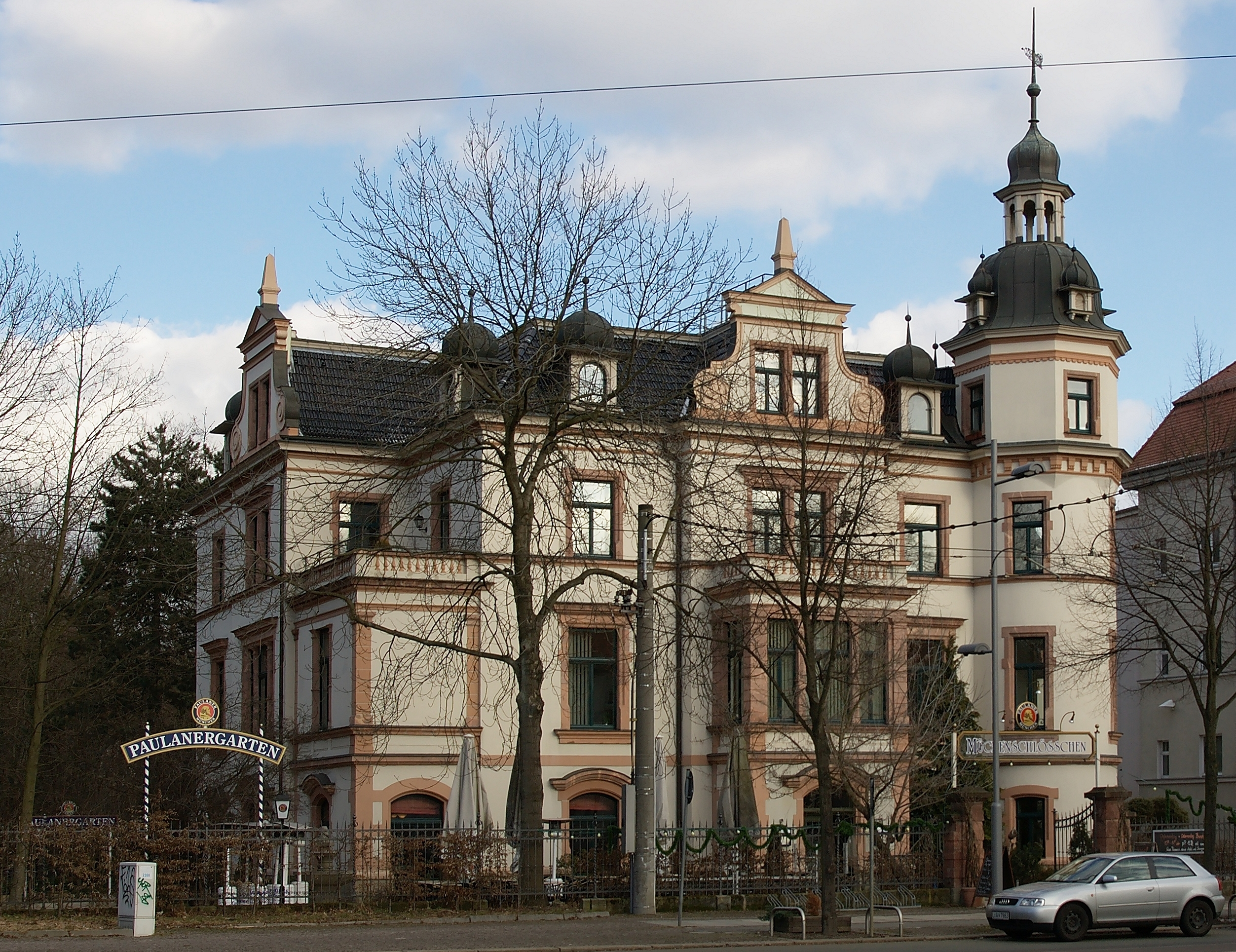
Mückenschlösschen (Mosquito castle) in 2010

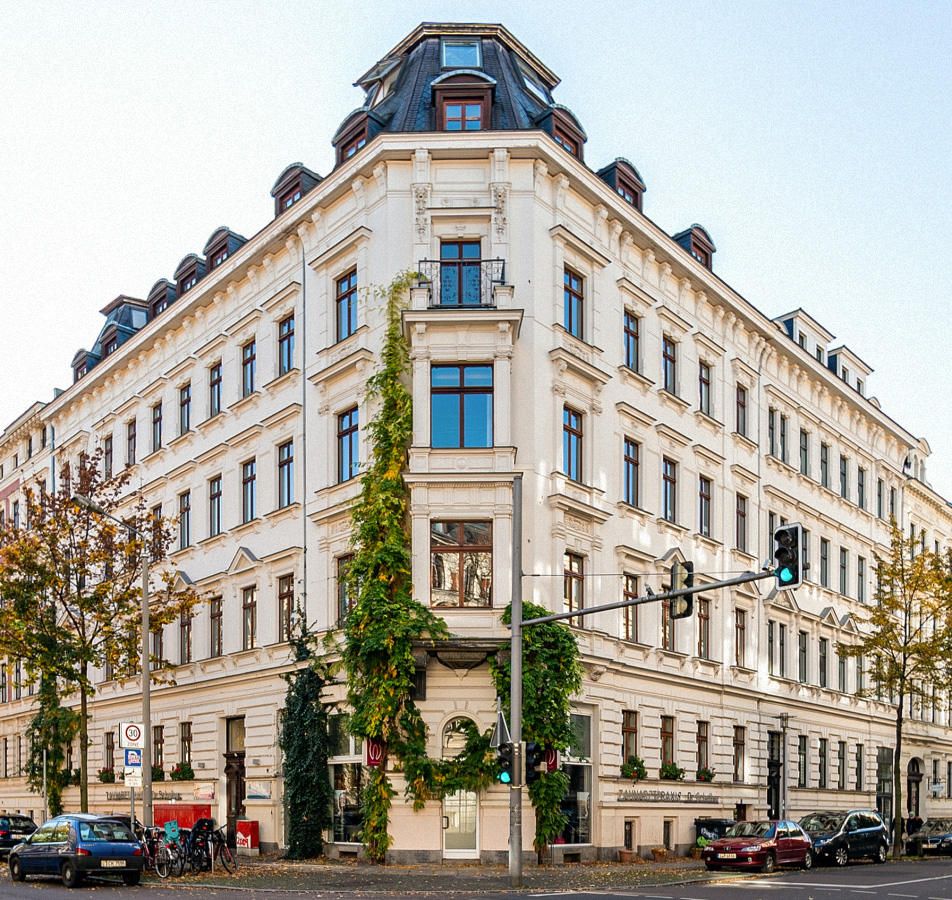
Tschaikowskistraße 11

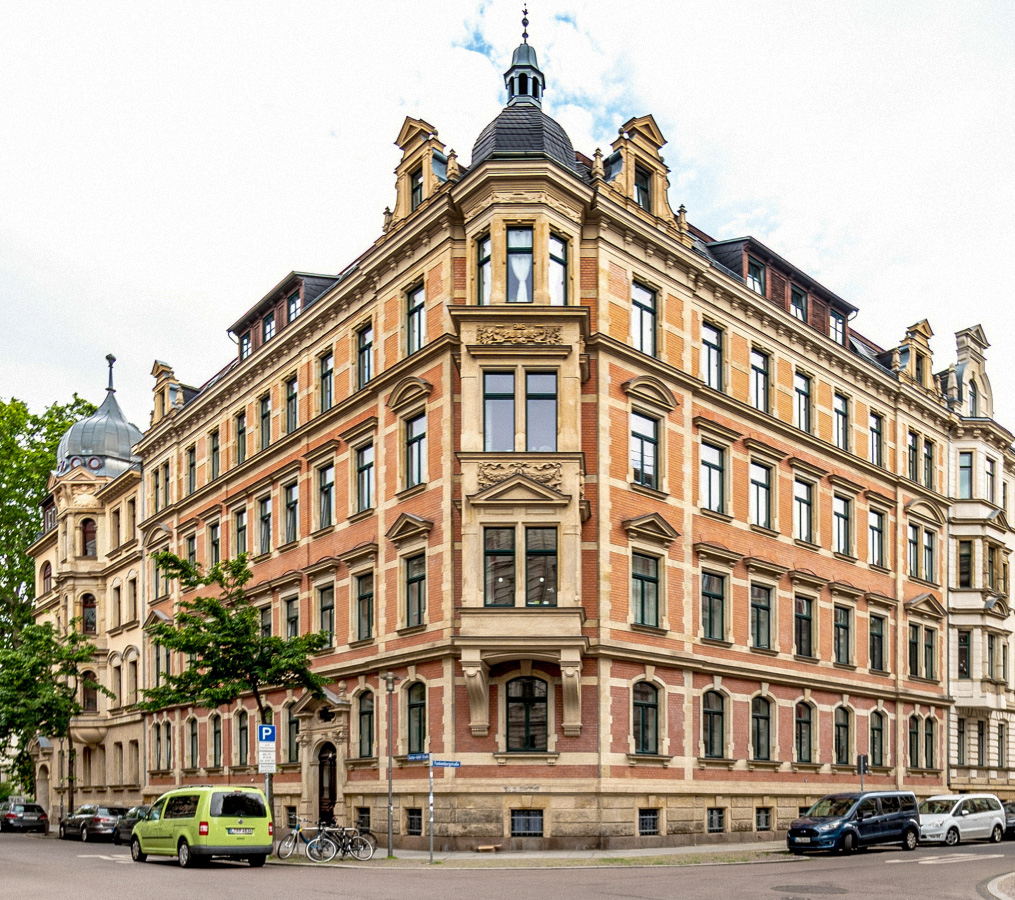
Gustav-Adolf-Straße 21

After the Große Funkenburg was demolished in 1897, the remaining area in the area of Funkenburgstrasse and Tchaikovskystrasse was also included in the rectangular street pattern and the district was expanded northwards to Christianstrasse. The northern part, from Fregestrasse onwards, was built in open block perimeter buildings, often in the now modern architectural style of Art Nouveau. Architects from the turn of the century such as Paul Möbius, Emil Franz Hänsel and Raymund Brachmann created striking residential buildings. At the northern end of the district, the Waldstrasse bridge was built over the Elstermühlgraben and a garden restaurant and café was built in 1892/93, which is called Mückenschlösschen (Mosquito castle) because of the area that was once full of mosquitoes.

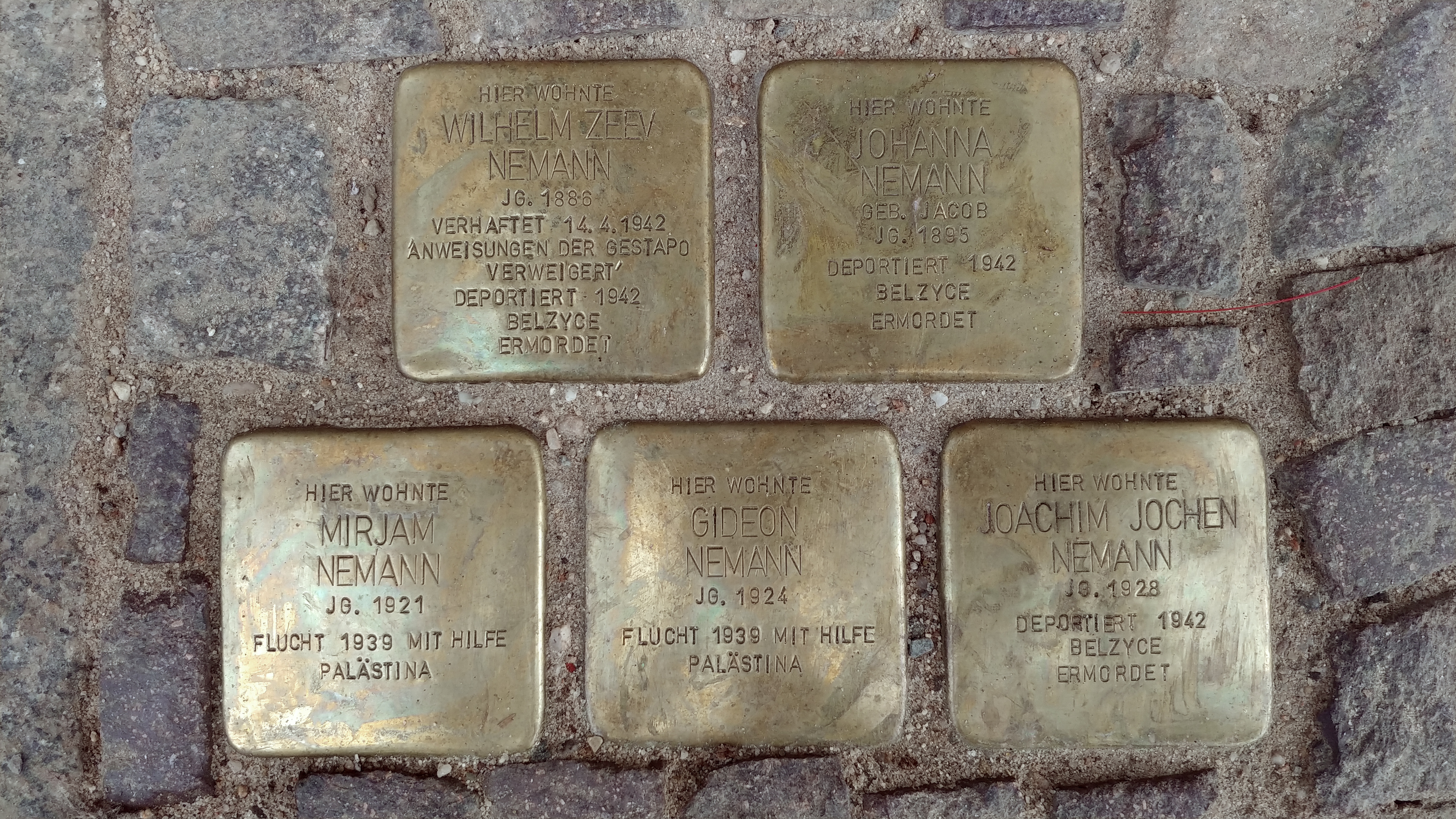
Stumpling stones for the deported jewish family Nemann in the neighbourhood

After the Jewish emancipation in Saxony, the proportion of the Jewish population in the neighbourhood increased. This was particularly evident in the trading city of Leipzig, where the majority of the traders were Jews from Eastern Europe. Many of them settled in what is now the Waldstrasse district, where almost 20 % of the population was of Jewish origin. Various Jewish social institutions emerged, such as the Eitingon Hospital or the Ariowitsch Foundation as a retirement home. The Jews of the Waldstrasse district were mainly employed in the fur trading center around Brühl Street. By 1933, around 2,500 Jewish people lived in the Waldstrasse district.

The area between Christianstrasse and Goyastrasse was the last construction phase to be built from around 1925 until the 1960s. In addition to residential buildings, there is also the former Jewish (Eitingon) hospital on the street of the same name.

During the period of industrial housing construction from the 1970s onwards, the building structure, some of which was severely damaged, was neglected, so that the houses continued to deteriorate. After reunification, the Gründerzeit style houses were gradually renovated.

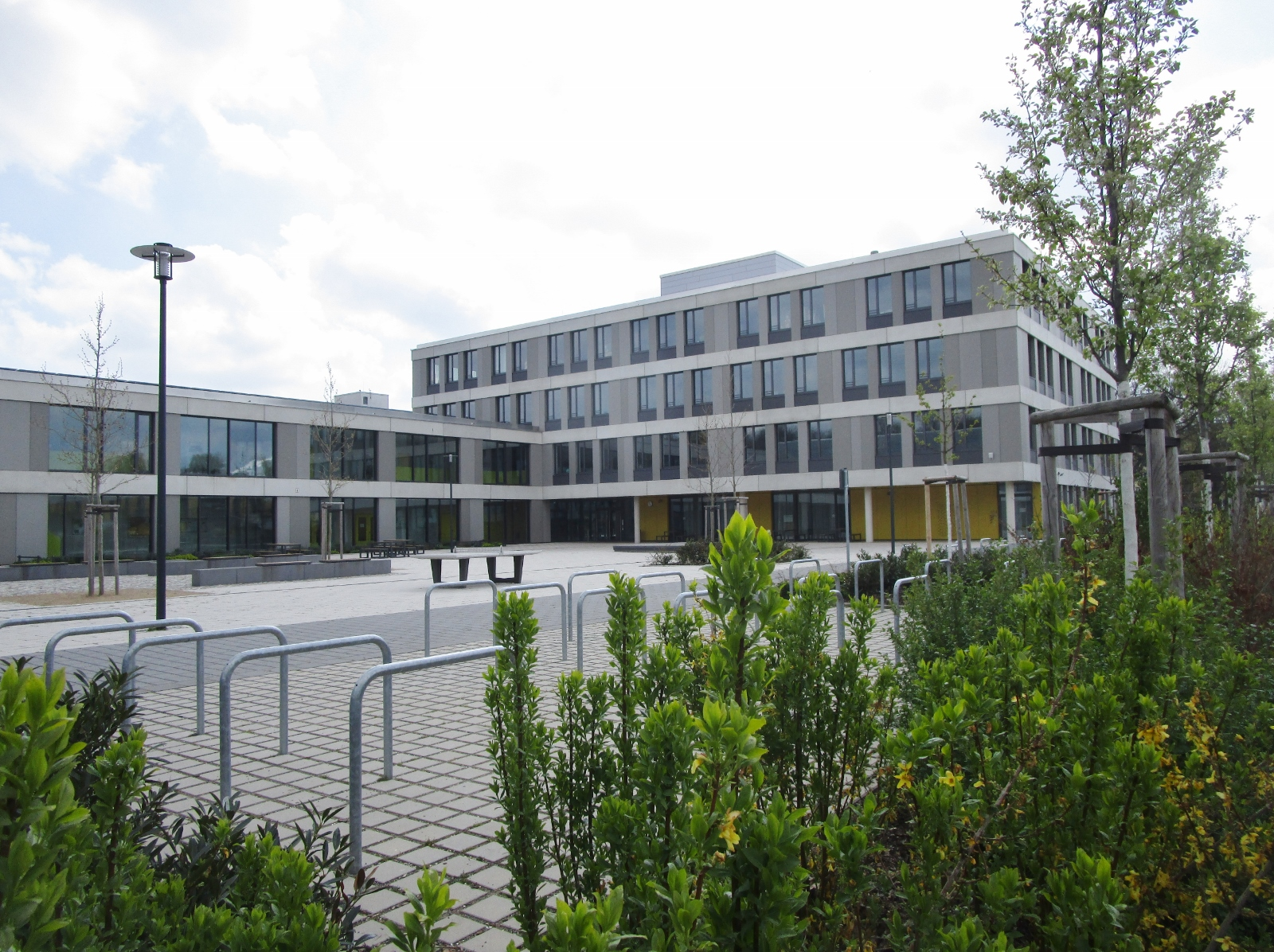
Sportoberschule Leipzig

In the area between Goyastrasse and Elstermühlgraben, after 1990, in addition to individual residential buildings, a car dealership, the Goyastrasse municipal nursing home (Städtisches Altenpflegeheim Goyastrasse) and a new building for the Leipzig secondary school for sports (Sportoberschule Leipzig) were built.

The city received a gold medal in the 1994 federal competition from the German Federal Ministry for Housing, Urban Development and Building for its strategy to preserve the Waldstrasse district. On the other hand, several well-preserved and listed buildings were demolished after 2000, for example the late classicist small Funkenburg and the residential and commercial building at Friedrich-Ebert-Strasse 81 a/b, primarily for traffic planning reasons, which led to massive public protests.

== Public facilities ==
In this district there is the Lessing-Grundschule (Lessing elementary school) and the Sportoberschule as well as the Leipzig Natural History Museum in the building of a former secondary school. The building of the former Höhere Israelitische Schule (Higher Israelite School) on Gustav-Adolf-Strasse houses the German Central Library for the Blind.

== Famous People ==
Numerous famous people have lived in the Waldstraßenviertel, many of whom were musicians. Examples are: Albin Ackermann-Teubner, Samuel Agnon, August Bebel, Max Beckmann, Georg Bötticher, Hans Driesch, Bernard Katz, Heinrich August Marschner, Georg Trexler, Auguste Schmidt.

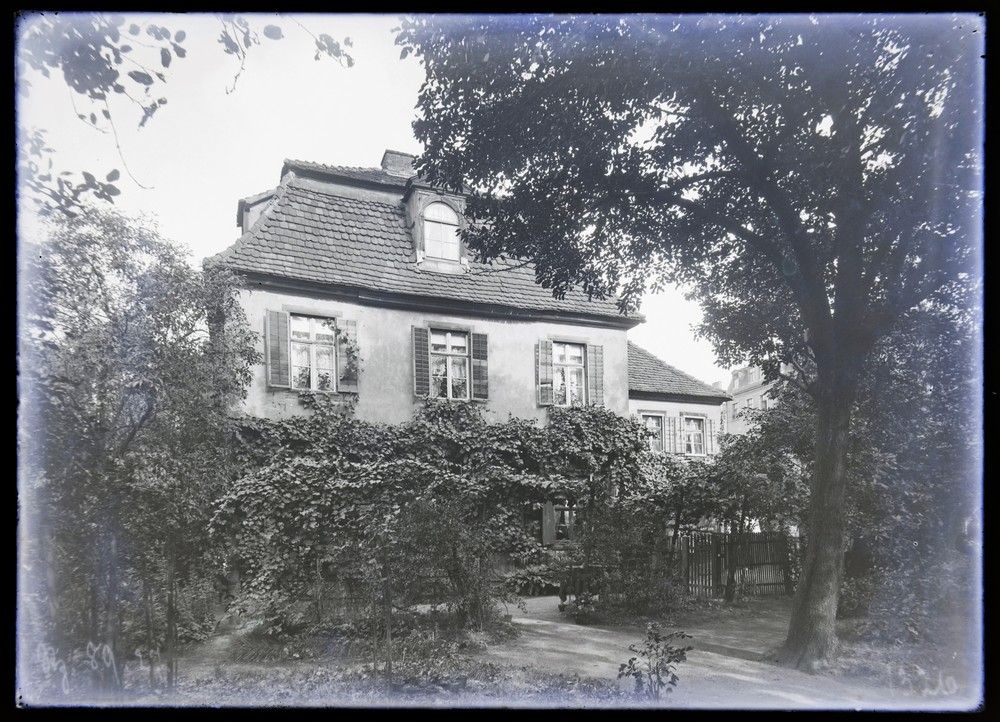
Lortzing's garden house (before 1897)

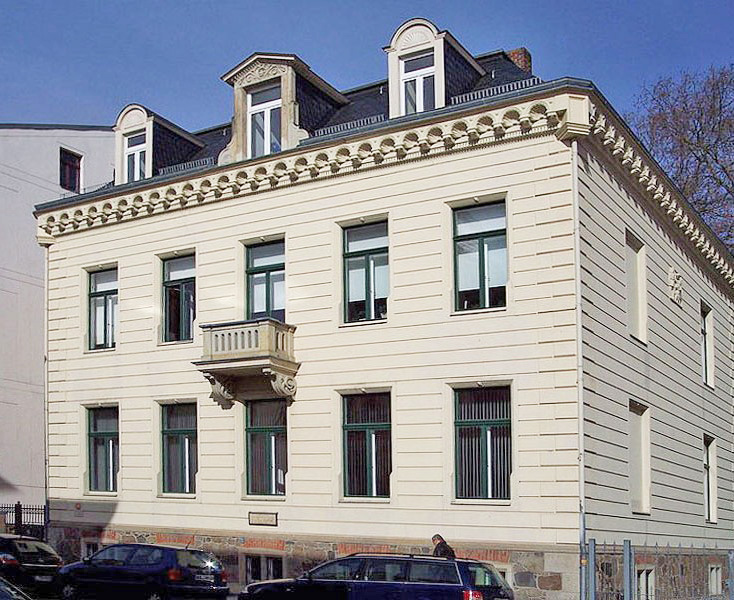
Gustav Mahler's home (2009)

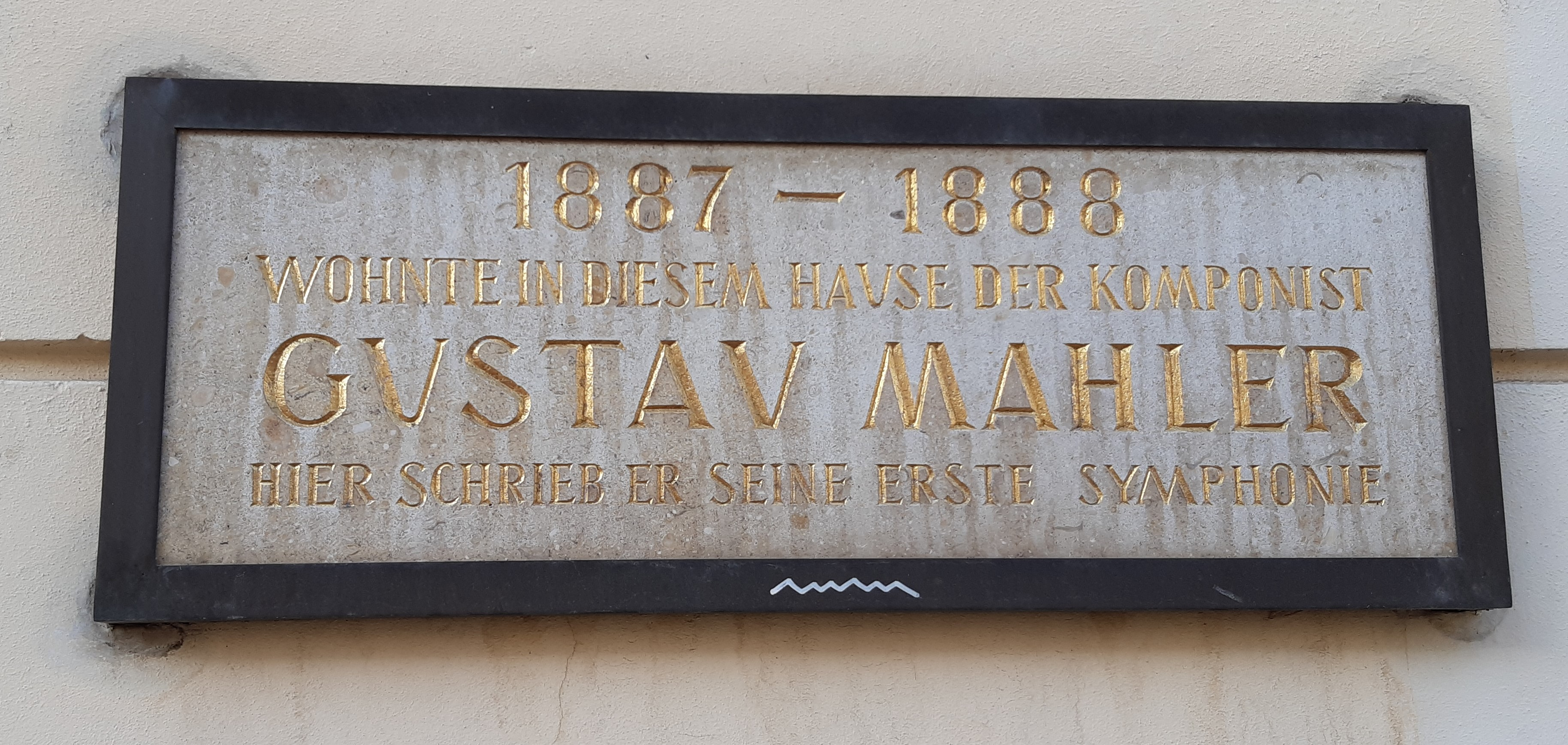
Memorial plaque on Mahler's home, Gustav-Adolf-Str. 12 (2022)

In 1827/1828 the composer Heinrich Marschner lived in the house named Goldene Laute (Ranstädter Steinweg 8) and completed his opera Der Vampyr here .

Albert Lortzing composed his opera Zar und Zimmermann (Tsar and Carpenter) in a garden house in the Funkenburg.

Gustav Mahler lived from 1887 to 1888 in number 12 Gustav-Adolf-Strasse and wrote his Symphony No. 1 there among others.

Since 2014, a memorial plaque at Hinrichsenstrasse 32 commemorates Friedrich Nietzsche, who lived there during several stays.

== Accessibility ==
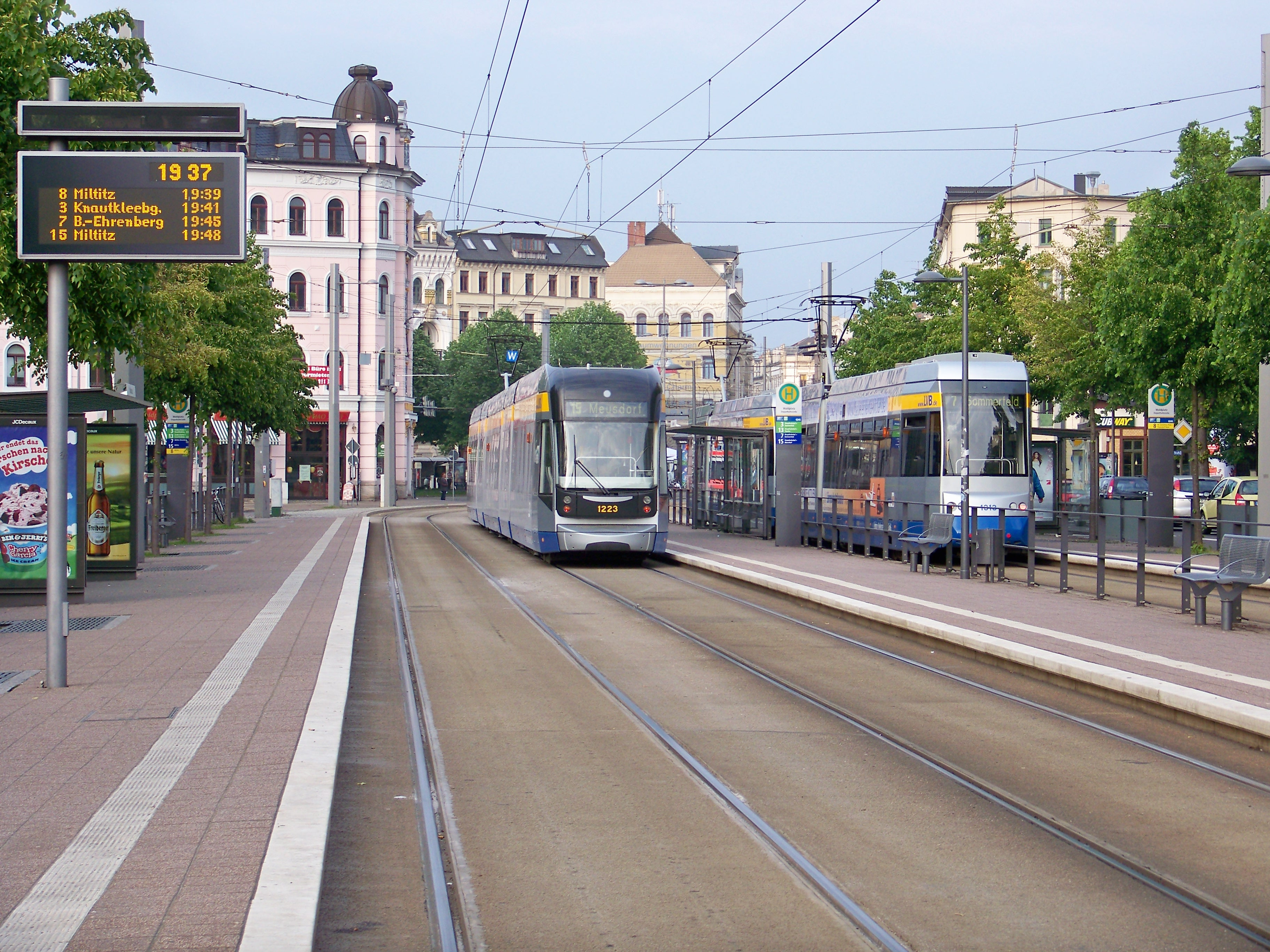
Waldstrasse, Tram stopp Waldplatz

The main streets of the Waldstrassenviertel are the Jahnallee which continuates the Ranstädter Steinweg coming from the city center and the Waldstrasse after that the neighbourhood is named. At the crossroads is a place named Waldplatz. In the main streets are tracks of the Leipzig tram with several tram stops:

- Leibnizstrasse (Line 3, 4, 7, 15)
- Waldplatz (Line 3, 4, 7, 8, 15)
- Feuerbachstrasse (Line 4)
- Am Mückenschlösschen (Line 4)

== See also ==
- List of streets and squares in Leipzig

== Bibliography ==
- Ringel, Sebastian (2023). Vom Wandel der Leipziger Vorstädte. 300 verlorene Bauten aus 160 Jahren (in German). Leipzig: überland Verlagsgesellschft mbH. ISBN 978-3-948049-07-2.
- Hocquél, Wolfgang (2023). Architekturführer Leipzig. Von der Romanik bis zur Gegenwart (in German). Leipzig: Passage Verlag. ISBN 978-3-95415-128-8.
- Riedel, Horst (2005). Stadtlexikon Leipzig von A bis Z (in German). Pro Leipzig. ISBN 3-936508-03-8.
- Lange, Bernd-Lutz (2006). Davidstern und Weihnachtsbaum. Erinnerungen von Überlebenden (in German). Berlin: Aufbau-Taschenbuch-Verlag. ISBN 978-3-7466-8143-6.
- Lehmstedt, Mark; Haß, Katja (2023). Leipziger Spaziergänge: Waldstraßenviertel (in German). Leipzig: Lehmstedt Verlag. ISBN 978-3957971449.
