= Arthur Kollmann =

German medical researcher (1858–1941)

Arthur Kollmann (1858–1941) was a German medical researcher from Hamburg who studied the fingerprint characteristics of friction ridges and volar pads.

In the 1880s (1883, 1885), Kollmann was the first researcher to address the formation of friction ridges on the fetus and the random physical stresses and tensions which may have played a part in their growth.

Kollmann may have been the first researcher to study the development of friction ridges. He grouped the volar pads of humans and also grouped the volar pads of many primates. Kollmann is credited with establishing and then naming ten volar pads in humans, and he was the first to study epidermic markings in different races. Alfred R. Hale described Kollmann as the first researcher (1883) to suggest that mechanical stresses inherent in fetal growth may influence the ultimate dermatoglyphic configuration.

He is buried in the Nordfriedhof, Leipzig.
