= Bridge blasting monument =

Coordinates: 51.342991°N 12.365012°E

- Brückensprengungsdenkmal
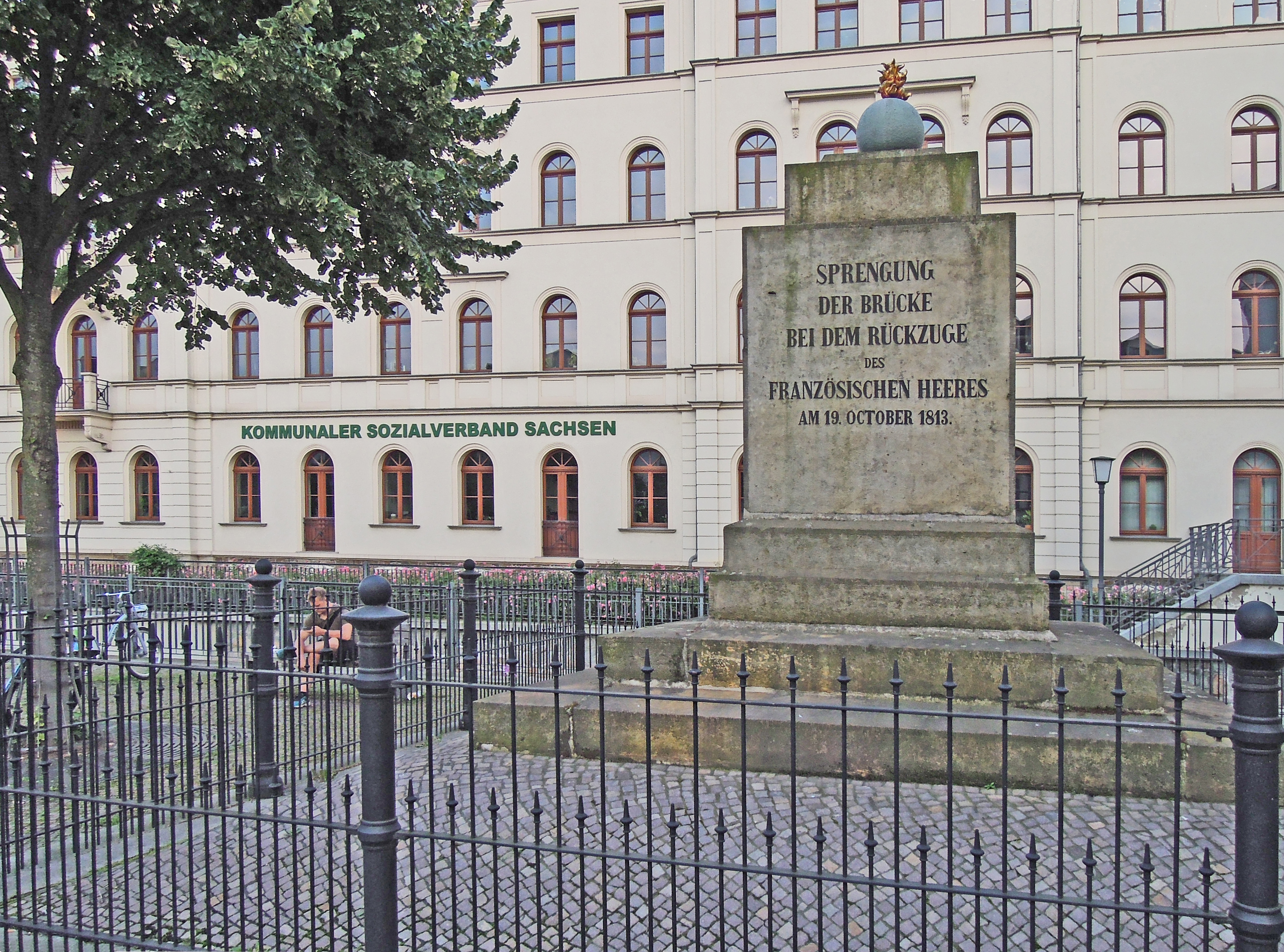
- Bridge blasting monument, Leipzig (2017)
- Interactive map of Bridge blasting monument
- Location: Leipzig, Germany
- Material: sandstone, granite
- Completion date: 1863
- Restored date: 2005–2006

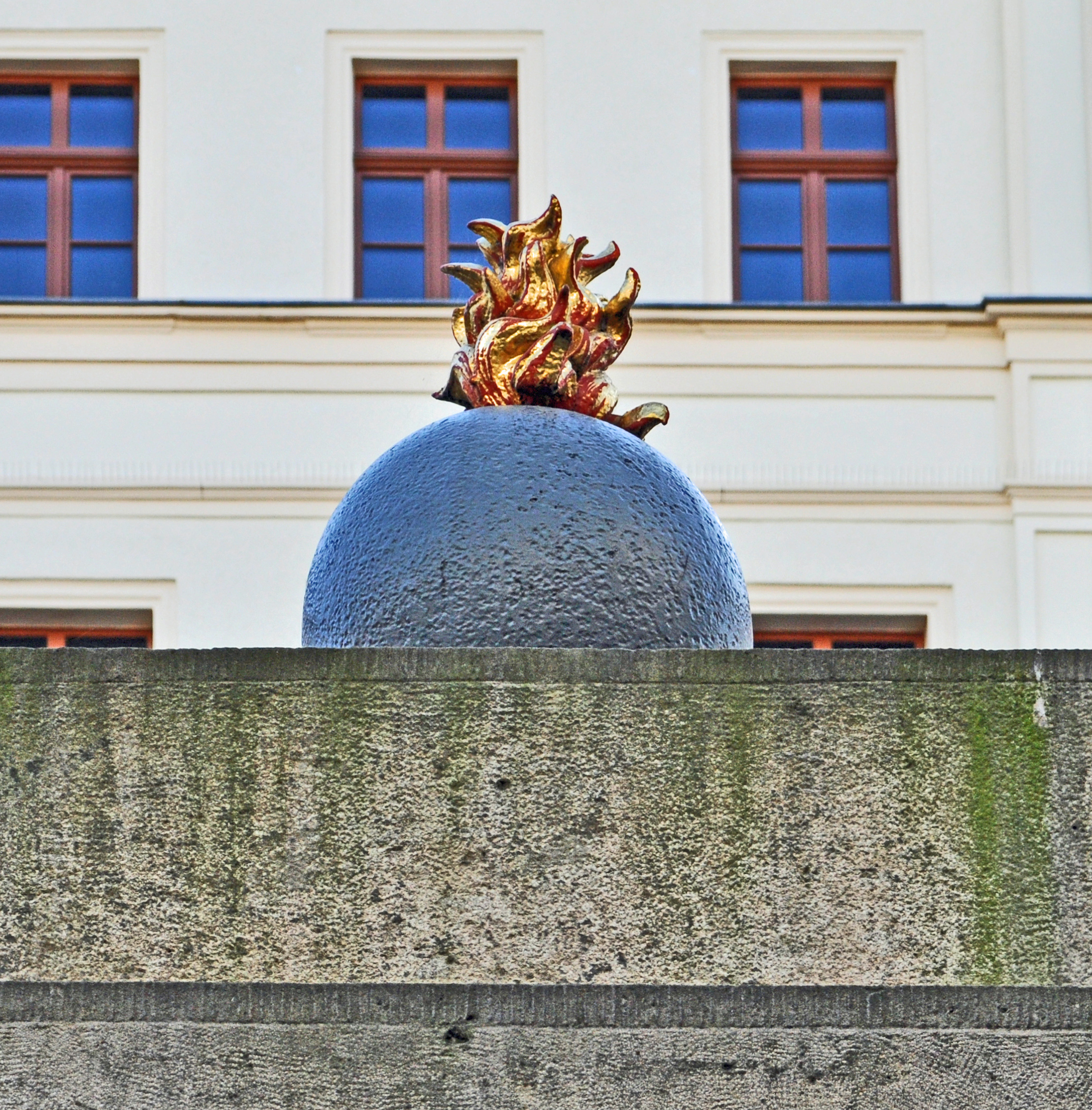
Explosive grenade with stylized flickering flame (2012)

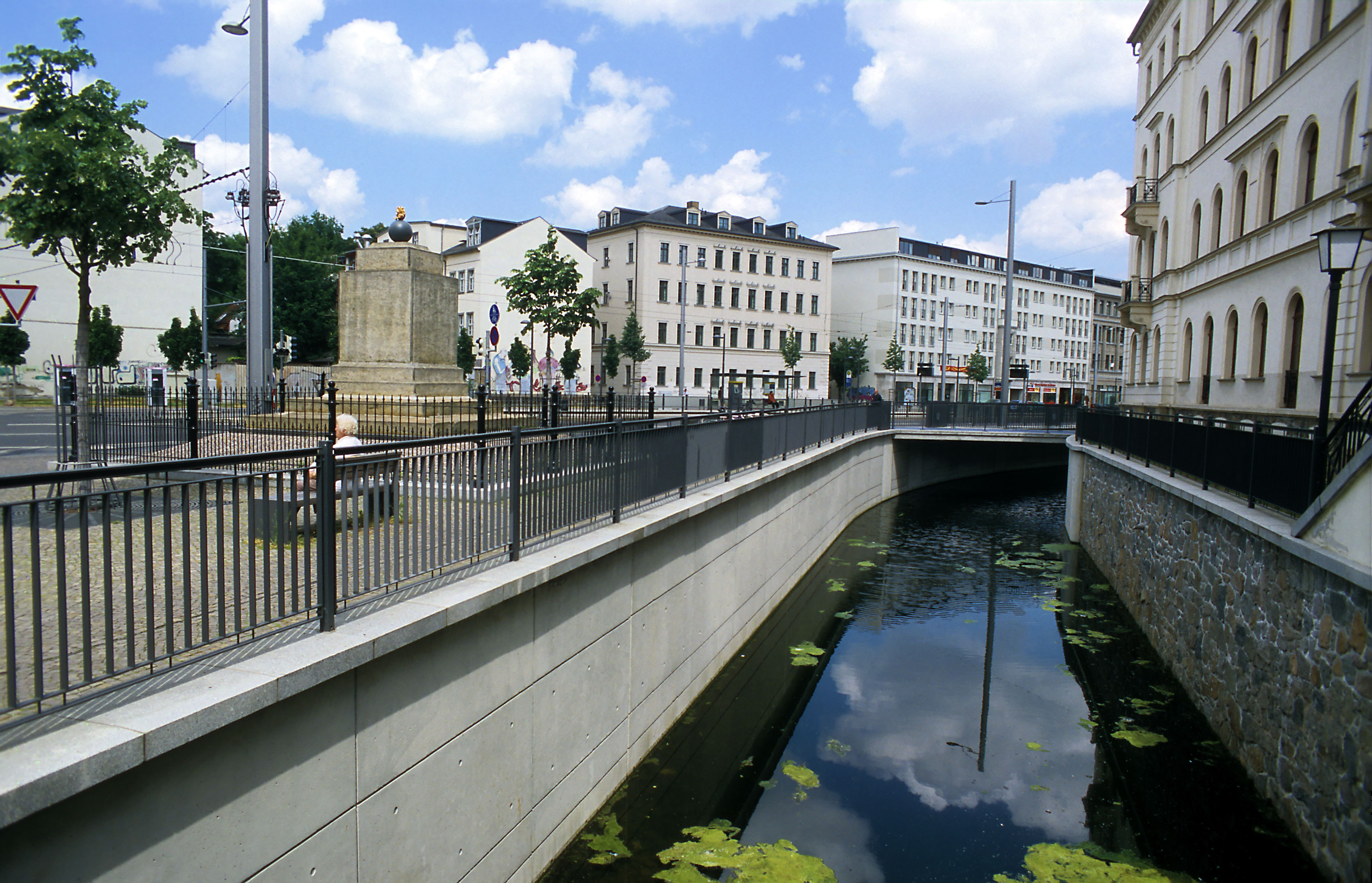
The Elstermühlgraben, on the left the Bridge blasting monument (2008)

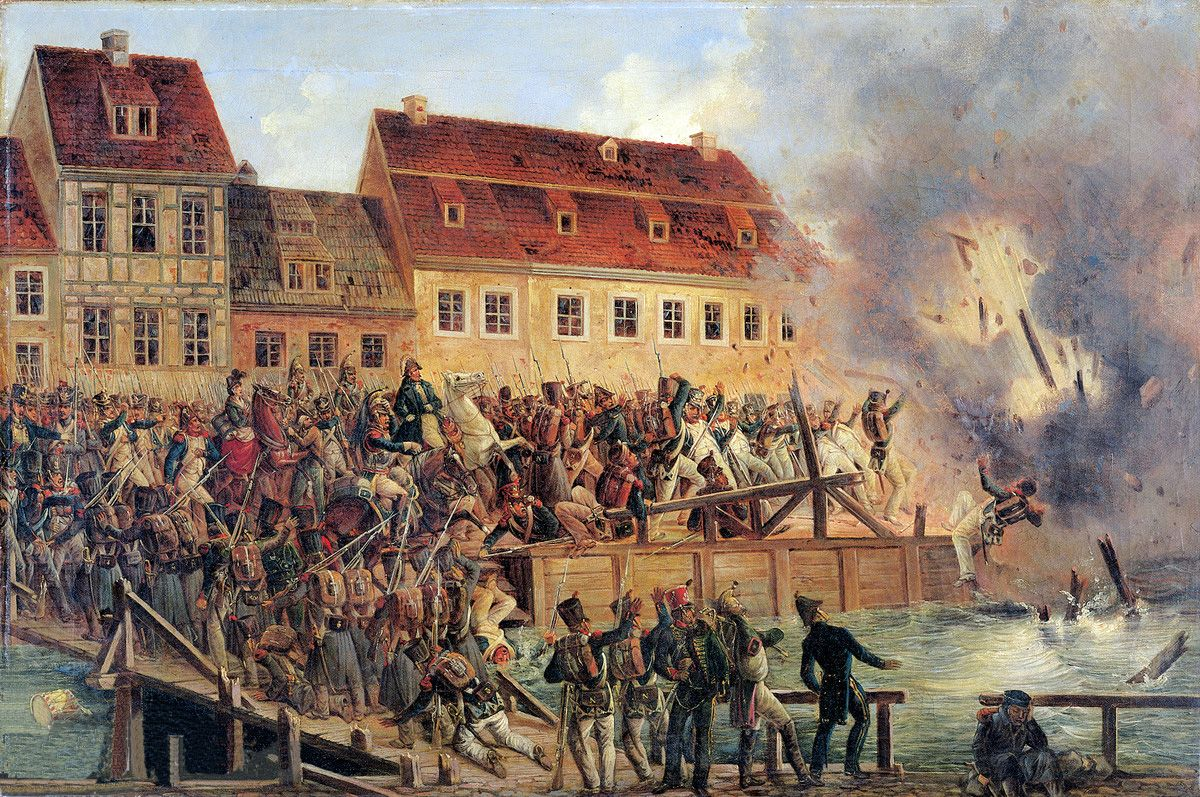
″Blasting of the Elster Bridge on 19 October 1813″, oil on canvas by Ernst Wilhelm Straßberger (before 1866)

The Bridge blasting monument (German: Brückensprengungsdenkmal) is a monument in Leipzig, Germany. It commemorates an event of the Battle of Leipzig. It is located in the borough Leipzig-Mitte in the locality Zentrum-West on the current Funkenburg Bridge (German: Funkenburgbrücke) over the Elstermühlgraben and is under heritage protection.

== Description ==
The memorial is a monumental multi-level base made of sandstone and granite, crowned at human height by a spherical explosive grenade. Behind the monument stretches the Elstermühlgraben, in front of it is a landscaped area at the intersection of Ranstädter Steinweg / Thomasiusstrasse / Jahnallee. On the stone plinth facing the street is the inscription in German: "The bridge was destroyed during the retreat of the French army on 19 October 1813." The cannonball is made of cast iron and features a stylized flickering flame. In the past, 16 other cannonballs were reportedly placed on a step around the base. The monument is surrounded by an iron fence.

== History of the monument ==
The monument was inaugurated by the "Association for the Celebration of the 19 October 1863" (German: Verein zur Feier des 19. October 1863), exactly 50 years after the events it commemorates. The city had approved the project and provided the required area free of charge. The prerequisite was that no inscription against the French people be affixed to the monument. The monument remained in place after 1945. At the beginning of the 21st century, the Elstermühlgraben was uncovered and the street was rebuilt accordingly. In this context, the sandstone monument was dismantled between 2005 and 2006, fully restored and rebuilt on a newly developed and designed area not far from the old site.

== The bridge blasting in 1813 ==
After the defeat of Napoleon and his allies at the Battle of the Nations near Leipzig on 18 October 1813, the French had only one possible route for their retreat to Thuringia. This was the road to Lindenau, which passed on an embankment through frequently flooded ground. Just behind the outer Rannisches Tor gate of the Leipzig city fortifications, the road passed over the stone bridge known as the Elster bridge (German: Elsterbrücke). Napoleon had ordered it to be blown up to prevent any pursuit by the coalition forces. However, the corporal in charge detonated the explosive charge prematurely by mistake, trapping 20,000 Frenchmen in Leipzig and preventing them from escaping. Many people drowned while trying to swim across the water body, which was swollen by heavy rains, including Polish General Józef Poniatowski, who was fighting on the French side, or were taken prisoner. Napoleon himself had crossed the bridge on horseback half an hour earlier.
