= Ranstädter Steinweg =

Street in Leipzig, Germany

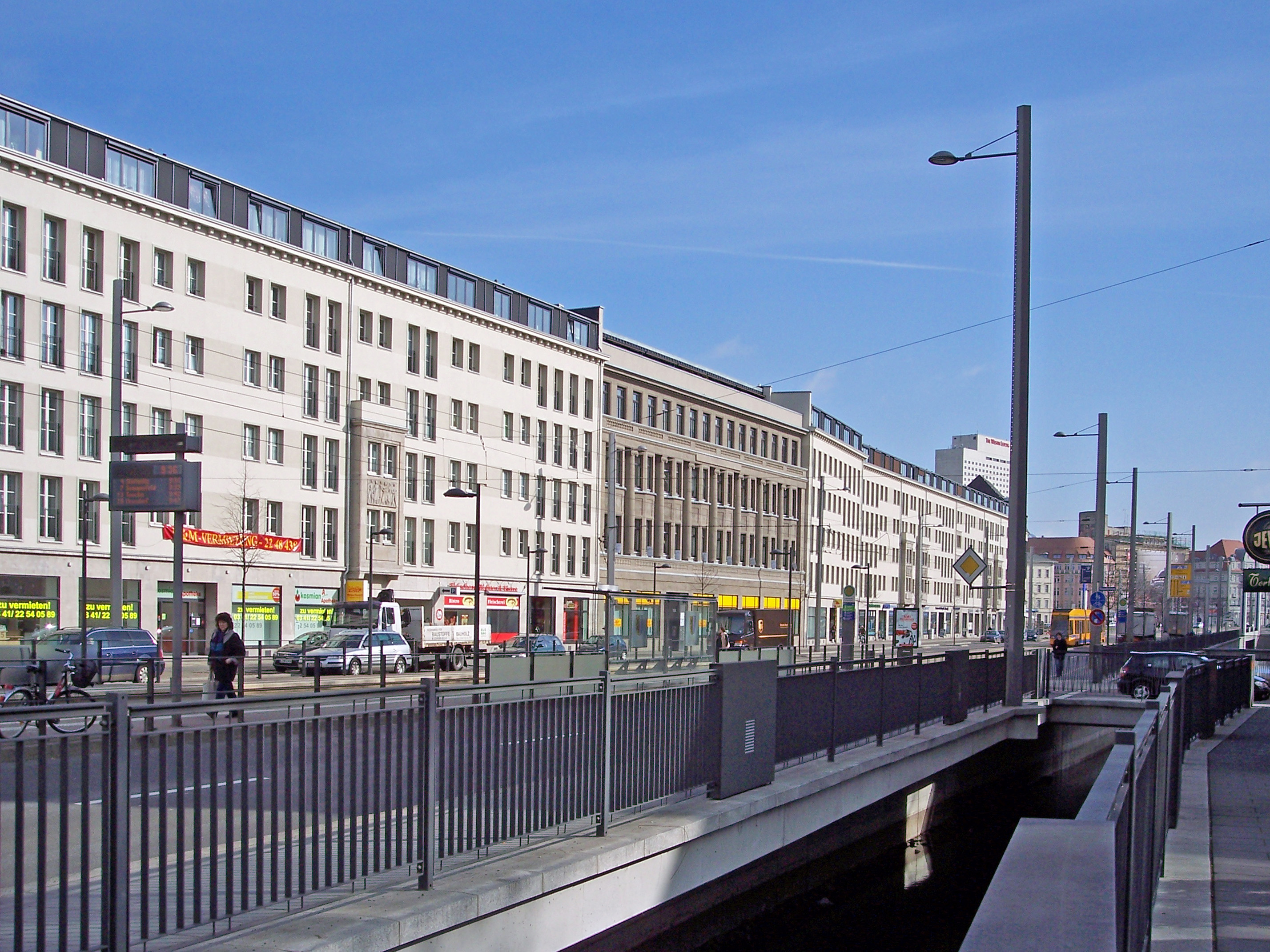
- Ranstädter Steinweg with Elstermühlgraben to the right
- Interactive map of Ranstädter Steinweg
- Former names: Frankfurter Straße, Straße der III. Weltfestspiele, Friedrich-Ludwig-Jahn-Allee
- Owner: municipal
- Length: 464 m (1,522 ft)
- Width: 43 metres (140 ft)
- Location: Leipzig-Mitte, Leipzig, Germany
- Postal code: 04109
- Nearest metro station: Tram stop Leibnizstrasse (lines 3, 4, 7 and 15)
- West end: Jahnallee
- East end: Inner City Ring Road
- North: Rosentalgasse, Jacobstrasse, Leibnizstrasse
- South: Naundörfchen, Thomasiusstraße

Construction
- Construction start: created in the late middle ages

The Ranstädter Steinweg (verbatim: stone road towards Ranstädt) is a street in Leipzig, Germany. It is in the Stadtbezirk of Leipzig-Mitte, the northern side of the street belongs to the locality of Zentrum-Nordwest, the southern to the locality of Zentrum-West. On the southern side is the open water body of the Elstermühlgraben.

== Description ==
Tram stop Leibnizstrasse on the Ranstädter Steinweg

The 464 metres (1,520 ft) long street begins at Leipzig's inner city ring road and runs from east to west. At its western end, it finds its continuation in Jahnallee. Ranstädter Steinweg and Jahnallee are parts of the Bundesstraße 87.

The Ranstädter Steinweg has two lanes in each direction. In the middle is a separate track of the Leipzig tramway. In addition, the road and the Elstermühlgraben have sidewalks and cycle paths. Several small bridges for pedestrians lead over the ditch.

On both sides of the street there is a closed 5-storey residential development, which dates from the first period after the Second World War. A house that was older was demolished in 2005. Each of the houses is a listed building. On the ground floor there are a number of small shops and also a Penny supermarket.

At the east end of the street, the street lighting is blue. This is to indicate that the road leads over the watercourse at this point. Otherwise, the bridge would only be noticeable to pedestrians going down a flight of stairs. The two water bodies of Elstermühlgraben and Pleißemühlgraben unite in this area. The latter is not perceptible above ground, as it has not yet been uncovered, unlike the Elstermühlgraben.

The adjacent undeveloped property at the southeastern end of Ranstädter Steinweg is intended for development with a high-rise building. In 1994, an architectural design competition was held for this purpose, which was won by the design by Vittorio Gregotti (Milan). However, the high-rise was not built (as of 2026).

At the western end of the Ranstädter Steinweg, the bridge blasting monument commemorates the events of the Battle of the Nations in 1813.

View from the Inner City Ring Road into Ranstädter Steinweg

Stairway down under the bridge over Elstermühlgraben and Pleißemühlgraben

Shops in the Ranstädter Steinweg

Bridge blasting monument on the end of Ranstädter Steinweg which goes to the left

Elstermühlgraben (2026)

== History ==
Inscription on this sign at the North Cemetery (Nordfriedhof) in Leipzig: "The remains interred here were discovered in April 2005 during construction work for the new course of the Elstermühlgraben canal at Ranstädter Steinweg. They likely originate from the cemetery of the St. James parish (Jacobsparochie)—founded around 1200—which was secularized in 1544."

The Ranstädter Steinweg is part of a historic road, the Via Regia, which already existed in the Middle Ages. In the 10th century, the west-east Via Regia crossed with the north-south Via Imperii in Leipzig in a place which is now the Richard-Wagner Platz. The Ranstädter Steinweg was located outside the city fortifications of Leipzig, at its eastern end was the Ranstädt Gate (Ranstädter Tor). The city gate and the street bore this name because the next town on the street was called Ranstädt (today Altranstädt). In front of the city gate, the Ranstädter Vorstadt, also known as the Rannische Vorstadt or Ransches Viertel, developed. Since time immemorial, this path has also been a Camino de Santiago. From the 12th century to 1544 there was a Jakobskirche (church of St. James) here (not preserved). On the southern side of today's Ranstädter Steinweg was the St.James parish (Jakobsparochie), on the northern side the settlement by the mill ditch (Mühlgrabensiedlung). It got its name from the Elstermühlgraben, which was created in the 12th century.

For centuries, the only passable path to the west began behind the bridge over the Elstermühlgraben, where there was a swampy floodplain landscape often flooded by floodwater. In the Battle of Leipzig, the French army had to retreat hastily after the defeat, which led to a catastrophe at this point when the bridge was blown up too early.

Part of the Rannische Vorstadt was already considered in need of renovation in the Leipzig general development plan of 1929. Concrete planning began in 1935, before the area fell victim to the bombs in the Second World War. Today's Ranstädter Steinweg was to be rebuilt as a main thoroughfare, and the 17 residential buildings on the street should become the first major new residential development complex in Leipzig after the war. The road was widened from 12.5 metres (40 ft) to 43 metres (140 ft). It led in the direction of the Sportforum with the Zentralstadion (today Red Bull Arena), which was also pushed forward with priority.

The Elstermühlgraben was vaulted in the Ranstädter Steinweg as early as 1879 and thus disappeared from the cityscape. Before the 2006 Football World Cup, a reconstruction of the road was taken as an opportunity to bring it back to daylight. This was also the first construction phase of a full-length disclosure of the ditch, which will not be completed until 2026. In April 2005 during construction work for the new course of the Elstermühlgraben canal at Ranstädter Steinweg human remains were discovered. They likely originated from the cemetery of the St. James parish. A sign at Leipzig’s North Cemetery states that these human remains were subsequently buried at the North Cemetery.

After the vaulting of the Elstermühlgraben in 1879, tracks of the "Lindenau tram line" were laid on the vault, which was opened on 22 July 1882 with a horse-drawn tram line to Lindenau.

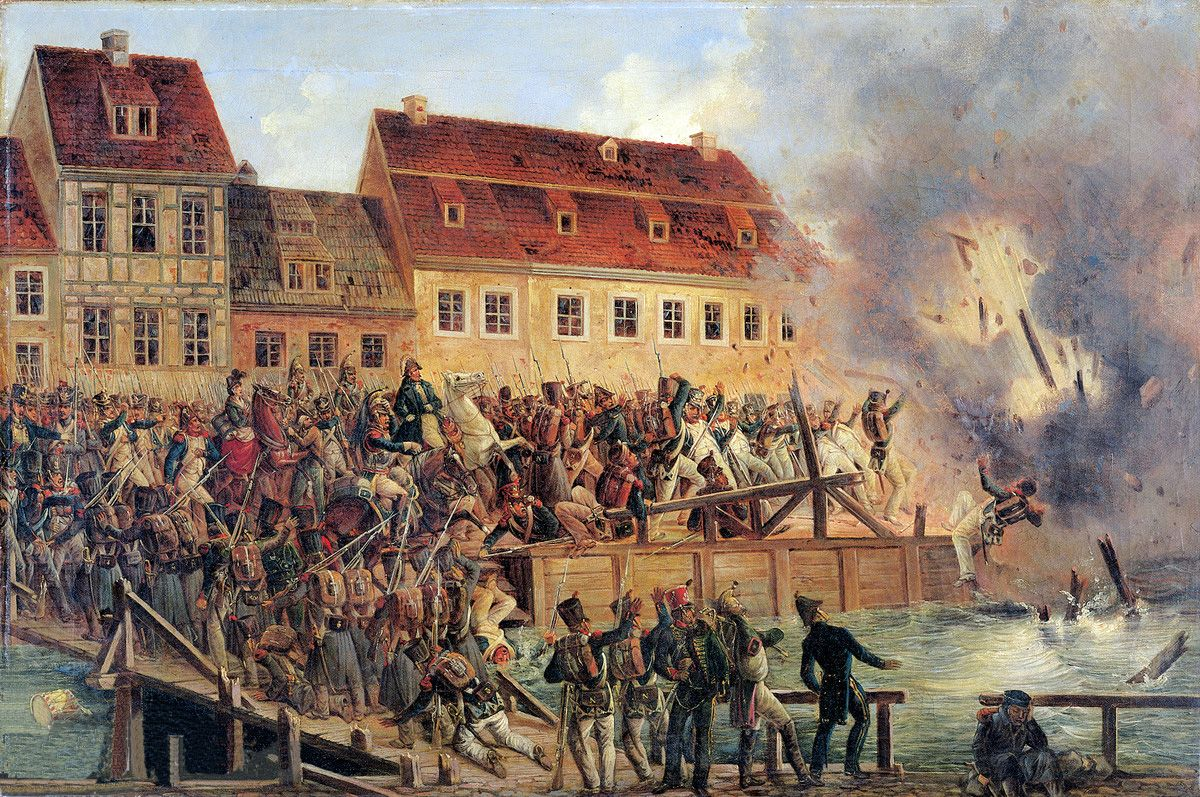
19 October 1813: Blowing up of the Elster Bridge, oil painting by Ernst Wilhelm Straßberger (before 1866)

View of the Ranstädter Steinweg before 1881

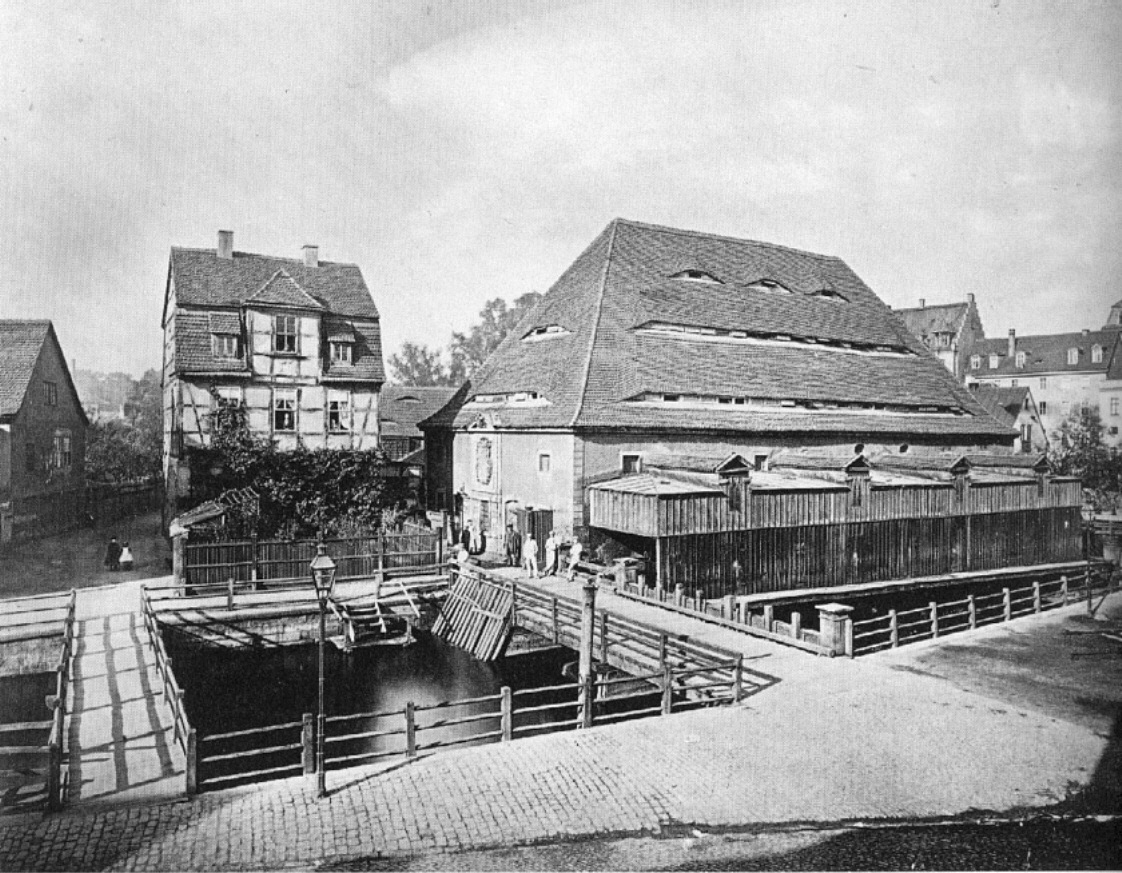
The mill called Angermühle on the Ranstädter Steinweg in 1875

New residential development after WW II

Demolition of the vault of the Elstermühlgraben in 2005

== Name ==
Reliefs with sports motifs
Reliefs by Alfred Thiele on the building Ranstädter Steinweg 8. The street leads in the direction of the Sportforum with the Zentralstadion (today Red Bull Arena).

The name Steinweg (verbatim: stone road) indicates that the street—unlike most other streets in Leipzig—was surfaced by a stone paving. Initially, there were four such stone-paved arterial roads in Leipzig: the Ranstädter Steinweg, the Peterssteinweg, the Grimmaischer Steinweg and the Hallischer Steinweg.

The eventful history of the street, which was known as Ranstädter Steinweg and Mühlgraben until 1839, is reflected in its frequent renaming. It was first formally named on 22 October 1839 by a council decision: as Frankfurter Strasse after a destination of the Via Regia, which was further away than Ranstädt. On the 50th anniversary of the Battle of the Nations in 1863, a section of Frankfurter Strasse was renamed Ranstädter Steinweg and thus bore the old name again. In 1905, another section of Frankfurter Strasse, which still existed, was renamed Ranstädter Steinweg. In 1951, Frankfurter Strasse, which was now called Stalinallee, and Ranstädter Steinweg were completely renamed Strasse der III. Weltfestspiele. The occasion was the 3rd World Festival of Youth and Students of the World Federation of Democratic Youth in East Berlin from 5 to 19 August 1951. In 1956, the street was renamed Friedrich-Ludwig-Jahn-Allee again, which was shortened to Jahnallee in 1991 by another decision. In 2006, the section of Jahnallee between Goerdelerring and Thomasiusstrasse was finally renamed Ranstädter Steinweg.

The new bridges created with the opening of the Elstermühlgraben were given the names Angermühlbrücke, Lautensteg, Carusbrücke and Fischersteg which took effect on 15 May 2006.

== Former residents ==
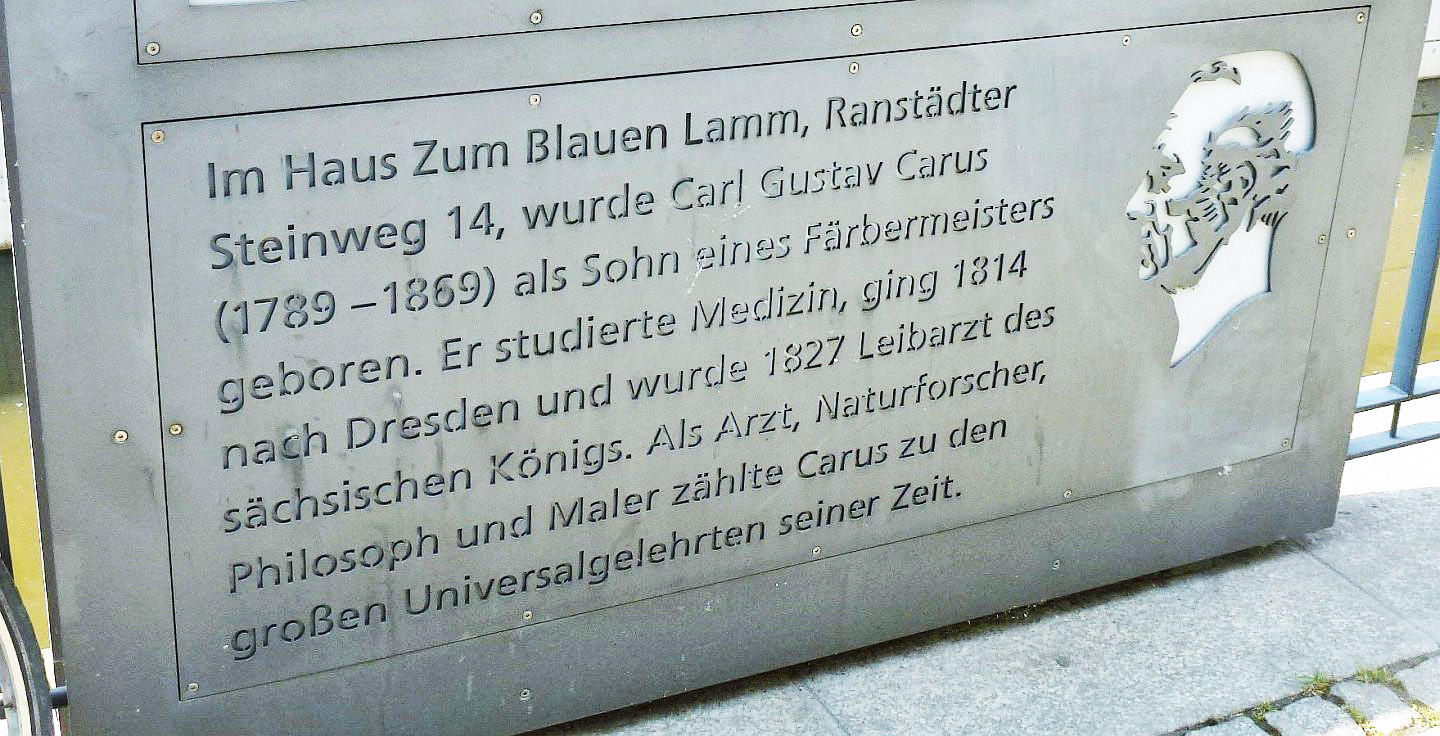
Commemorative plaque for Carl Gustav Carus (2016)

The physiologist and painter Carl Gustav Carus was born in 1789 in Ranstädter Steinweg, a commemorative plaque on the Elstermühlgraben commemorates him.

From 1827 to 1828, the Kapellmeister and composer Heinrich Marschner lived in the Gasthaus Zur goldenen Laute (today Ranstädter Steinweg 8) and completed his opera Der Vampyr there, with which he made his breakthrough as an opera composer. The inn has not been preserved, it stood a little west of the junction of Jacobstrasse; a memorial plaque refers to the house and the composer; the Lautensteg bridge also takes its name from the former inn.

Since 2023, a commemorative plaque has commemorated the fact that the female doctor Anna Marie Kuhnow lived and worked in the then house at Ranstädter Steinweg 13 from 1890 to 1893. She was the first licensed female physician in Leipzig and belonged to the "daughter generation" of the German women's movement.

Stolpersteine

Three generations of the Laubinger family.

The family Weiss

Family Hammerstein

Stolpersteine in Ranstädter Steinweg comemmorate the Victims of Nazi Germany who lived there.

20 Stolpersteine for the members of the Weiss, Laubinger and Hammerstein families who were Victims of Nazi Germany (the youngest of them, Monika Laubinger, born in 1941), lie in the pavement on the south side of the Ranstädter Steinweg.

== See also ==
- List of streets and squares in Leipzig
- Architecture of Leipzig
