= Elstermühlgraben =

Elstermühlgraben (litt. Elster mill race)
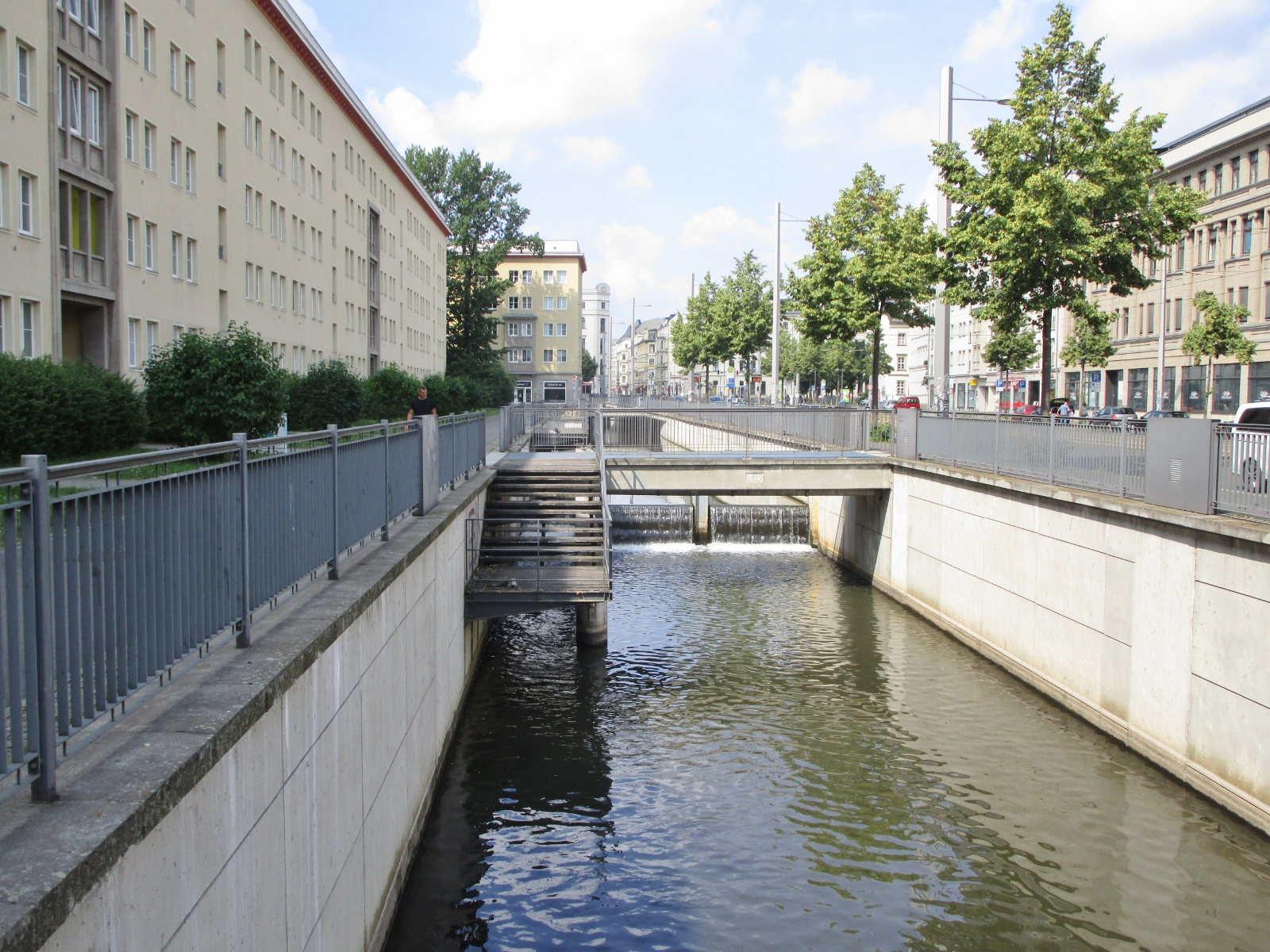
- The Elstermühlgraben and a spinning water wheel along a street called Ranstädter Steinweg

Specifications
- Length: 4 km (2 mi)

History
- Construction began: 12th century
- Date closed: 19th century through 20th century step by step arched over
- Date restored: since 2007 opening step by step

Geography
- Start point: Confluence with the White Elster and the Elster Flood Channel at the Palmengarten weir
- End point: Confluence with the White Elster at the Rosental sewage treatment plant
- Beginning coordinates: 51.334863°N 12.350805°E
- Ending coordinates: 51.355197°N 12.339239°E

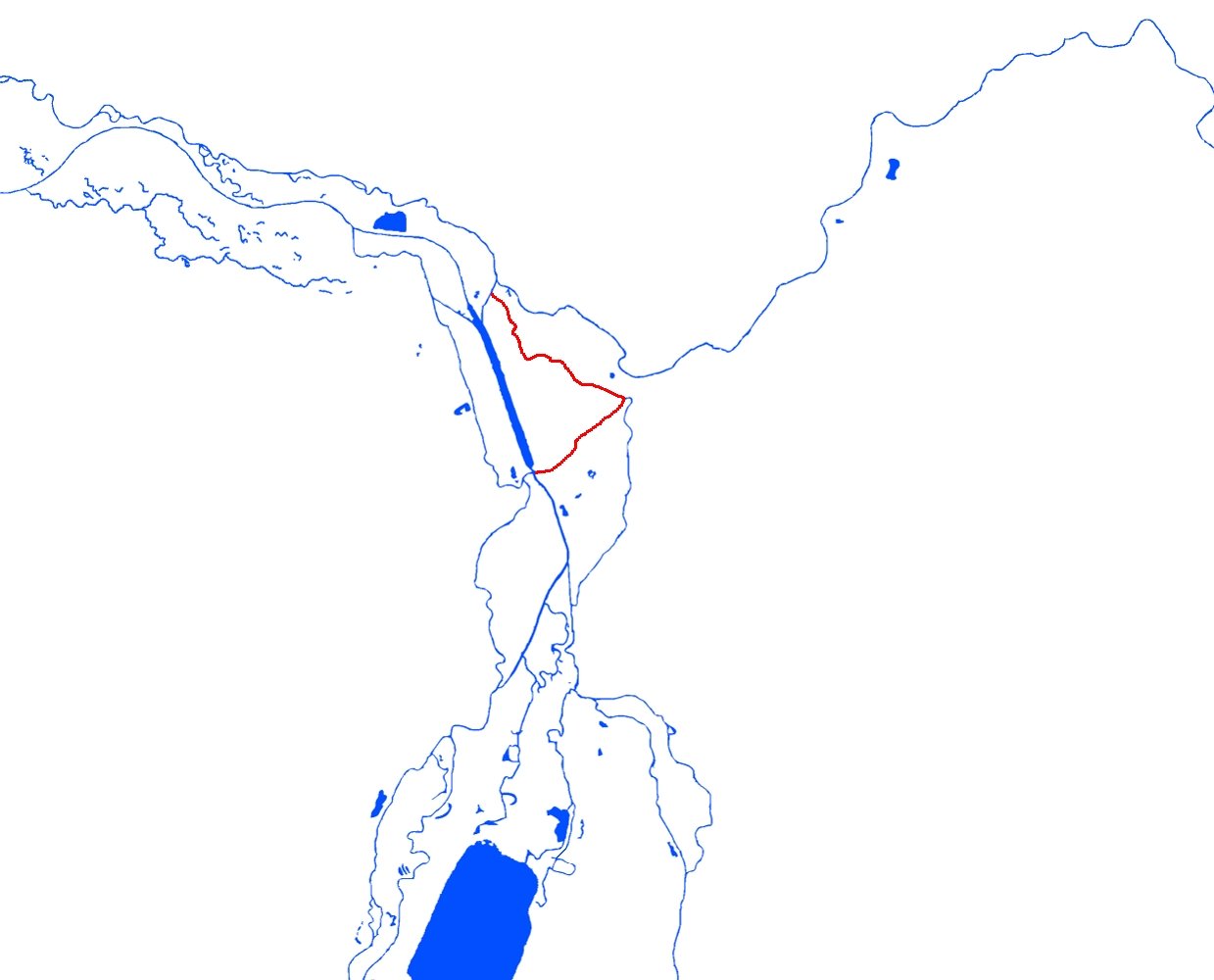
The Elstermühlgraben (red) in the Leipzig waterknot

The Elstermühlgraben (litt.: Elster mill race or Elster mill ditch) is an approximately 4 km (2 mi) long, now partially underground mill canal in the city of Leipzig, Germany, in the Zentrum-West and Zentrum-Nordwest localities. It exists as an artificial tributary of the White Elster for more than 800 years.

== Course ==
In its current, repeatedly corrected course, the Elstermühlgraben originates as a right-hand branch of the Elster flood channel, shortly before it receives the White Elster coming from the left and flows into the Elster basin at the Palmengarten weir. It initially flows in a northeasterly direction towards the city center, then forms a knee at the level of the street called Ranstädter Steinweg (which it passes under) and continues to flow in a northwesterly direction between Waldstraßenviertel and Rosental back to the White Elster, before finally flowing back into it. The northern part of the Mühlgraben follows the bed of the old Elster.

== Bridges ==
The Peterssteg at the beginning of the ditch, the Saints Bridge on Moschelesstrasse and the Schreberbrücke on Schreberstrasse lead over the Elstermühlgraben. The Blüthnersteg was built near the new weir at the Leipzig City Harbour (opened in 2026) and named in memory of the piano factory Blüthner that was once located next to it, owned by Julius Blüthner. At the Westbrücke, the Elstermühlgraben passes under Friedrich-Ebert-Strasse and then, passes Elsterstrasse at the Elsterbrücke and Lessingstrasse at the Poniatowskibrücke. Behind Lessingstrasse, the Mühlgraben passes under Funkenburgbrücke.

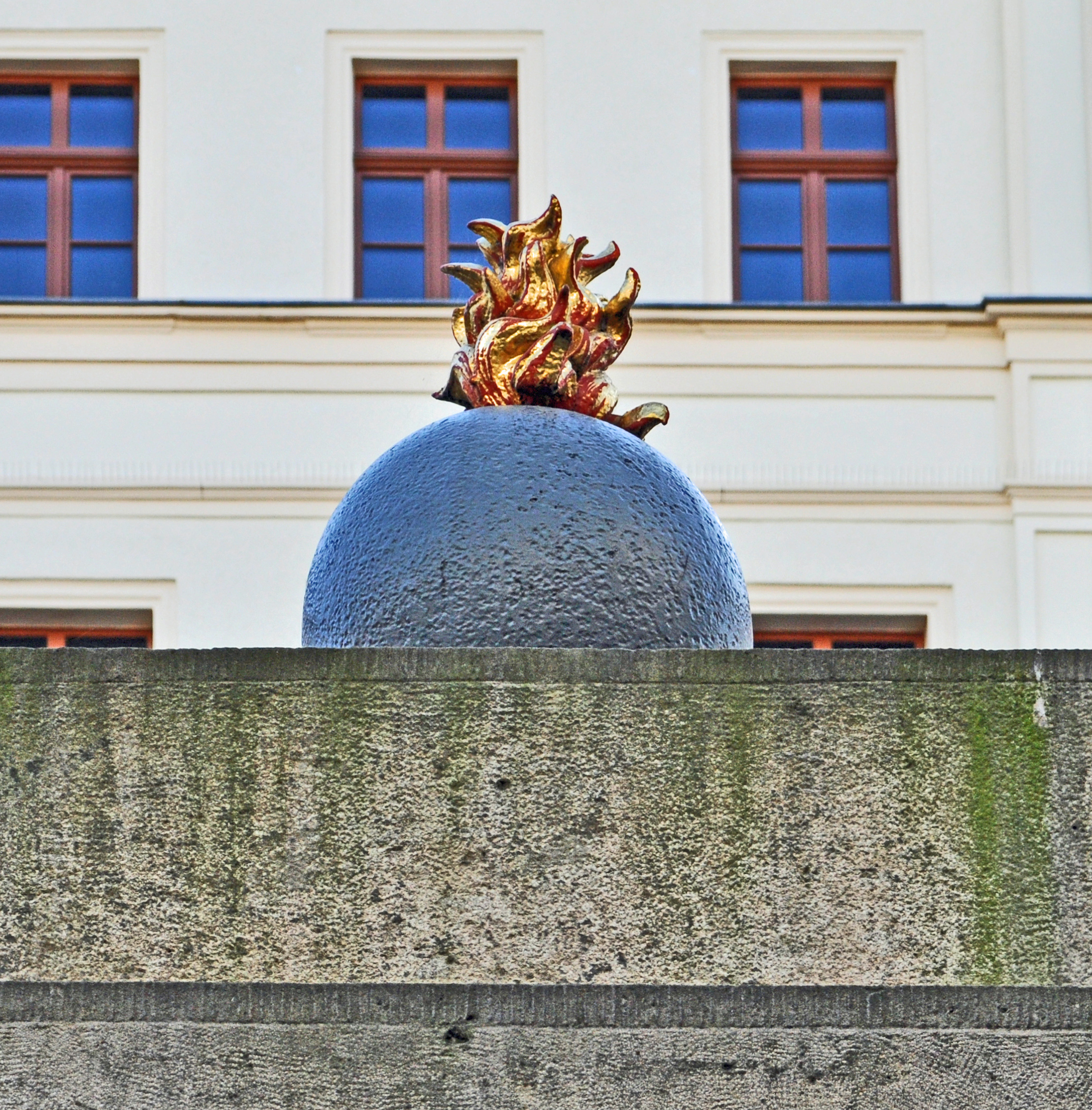
Detail of the Bridge blasting monument

At the top is the Bridge blasting monument (German: Brückensprengungsdenkmal), which commemorates the events of the 19 October 1813, during the Battle of Leipzig. At this spot, many soldiers were killed in the water swollen by rainfall, including the Polish prince and French marshal Józef Poniatowski.

This is followed by the Fischersteg, Carusbrücke, Lautensteg and the Angermühlbrücke on Ranstädter Steinweg, then the Gustav-Adolf-Brücke and the Leibnizbrücke on the streets of the same name. At Liviaplatz, the Fregesteg leads from the Waldstraßenviertel into the Rosental, followed by the Waldstraßenbrücke, the Leutzscher Allee bridge and finally, before the confluence with the Elster, the Staxbrücke at the Rosental sewage treatment plant.

== History ==
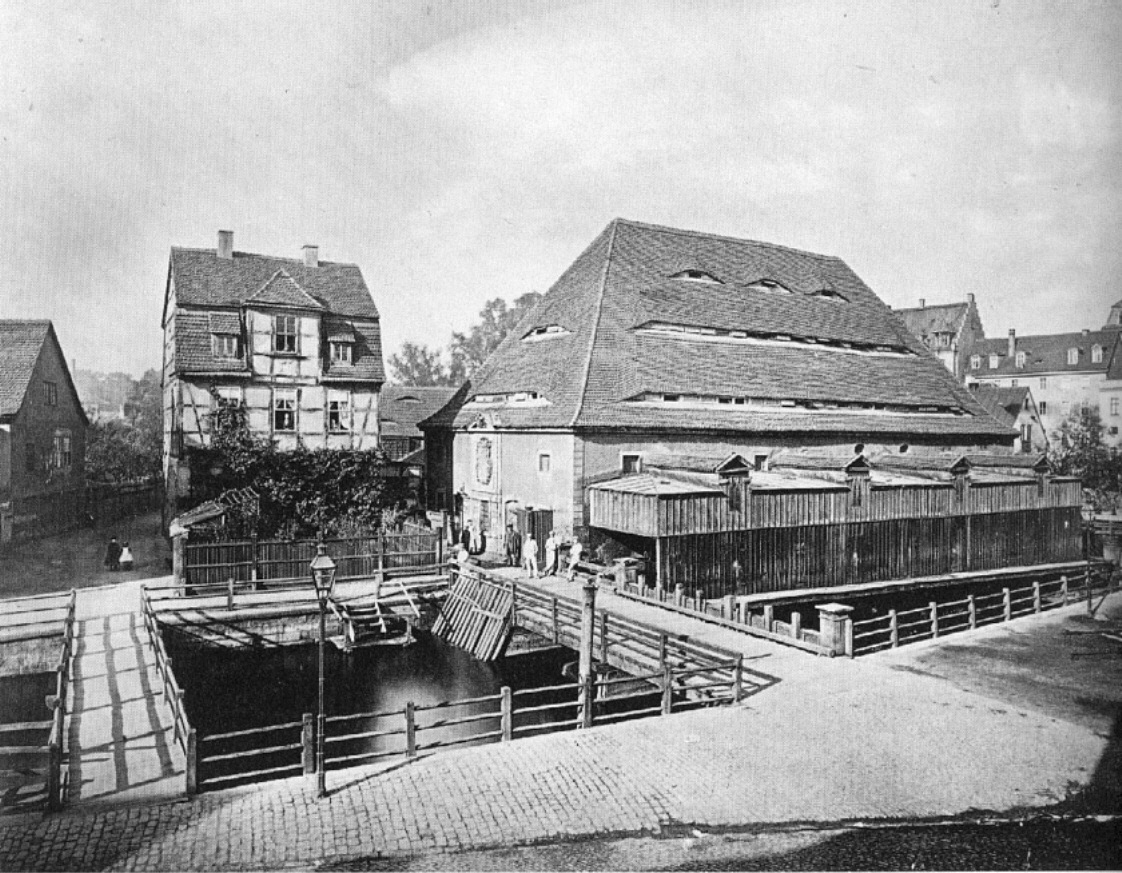
The Angermühle on Ranstädter Steinweg in 1875

In the 12th century the Elstermühlgraben was built to regulate the regular spring floods and to operate mills. Some of these were still preserved and in use until the late 19th century (such as the Angermühle, which was demolished in 1878). A settlement on the banks of the Mühlgraben has been documented since the early 13th century. Until Leipzig's strong expansion around 1850, the canal lay completely outside the city proper. As part of the expansion of the Ranstädter Steinweg, the Mühlgraben was arched over in this area in 1878. In the 20th century, Leipzig's rivers became very polluted by the discharge of sewage and their inner-city courses were largely arched over or piped, as was the case with the Elstermühlgraben around 1960. Since the reunification of Germany in 1990, the water quality has noticeably improved, which is why the previously almost 1,000 m (3,281 ft) long underground section of the Mühlgraben has been gradually reopened since 2004 for renaturation and to improve the quality of living and leisure as well as flood protection.

The first construction phase of the opening of the Elstermühlgraben from Thomasiusstraße to Angermühlbrücke was completed in September 2007, the second construction phase between Schreberbrücke and Friedrich-Ebert-Straße in August 2010. Work on the third construction phase has been underway since September 2013. On 21 May 2015, a section along Carl-Maria-von-Weber-Straße was inaugurated. After temporary delays in the construction process, the section between Thomasiusstraße and Lessingstraße was also uncovered again by June 2019. The new Elsterbrücke was completed in March 2023. The last section from Elsterstraße to Lessingstraße including the Poniatowskibrücke is to be built by 2024–2025.

Since 2003, there have been plans to reopen or recreate the Alte Elster, which has been filled in since 1926, from the Elstermühlgraben from Schreberbad to the north of the Waldstraßenviertel in a slightly modified course as the main bed of the Elster.

In April 2014, the Leipzig city harbor for tourist and sports boats was inaugurated on the Elstermühlgraben next to the Schreberbad. The metal sculpture by Rainer Henze "The Wave - 100 Years of DLRG" at the city harbor commemorates the founding of the German Life Saving Association (DLRG) in Leipzig in 1913.

== See also ==
- Bodies of water in Leipzig

== Bibliography ==
- Niels Gormsen (2005). "Gewässer ans Licht - Öffnung und Renaturierung der Mühlgräben in der Stadt". Der Leipzig Atlas [Uncover the Bodies of Water - Opening and Renaturation of the Mill Races in the City] (in German). Herrmann-Josef Emons Verlag. pp. 32–33. ISBN 3-89705-269-5.
