= Zentrum-West =

- Stadtteil of Leipzig
- Interactive map of Zentrum-West
- Location within Germany Location within Saxony
- Coordinates: 51°20′21″N 12°21′46″E
- Country: Germany
- State: Saxony
- District: Urban district
- City: Leipzig

Area
  - Total: 1.646 km^{2} (0.636 sq mi)

Population (2025-12-31)
  - Total: 11,654
  - Density: 7,080/km^{2} (18,340/sq mi)
- Time zone: UTC+01:00 (CET)
  - Summer (DST): UTC+02:00 (CEST)
- Postal codes: 04109
- Dialling codes: 0341

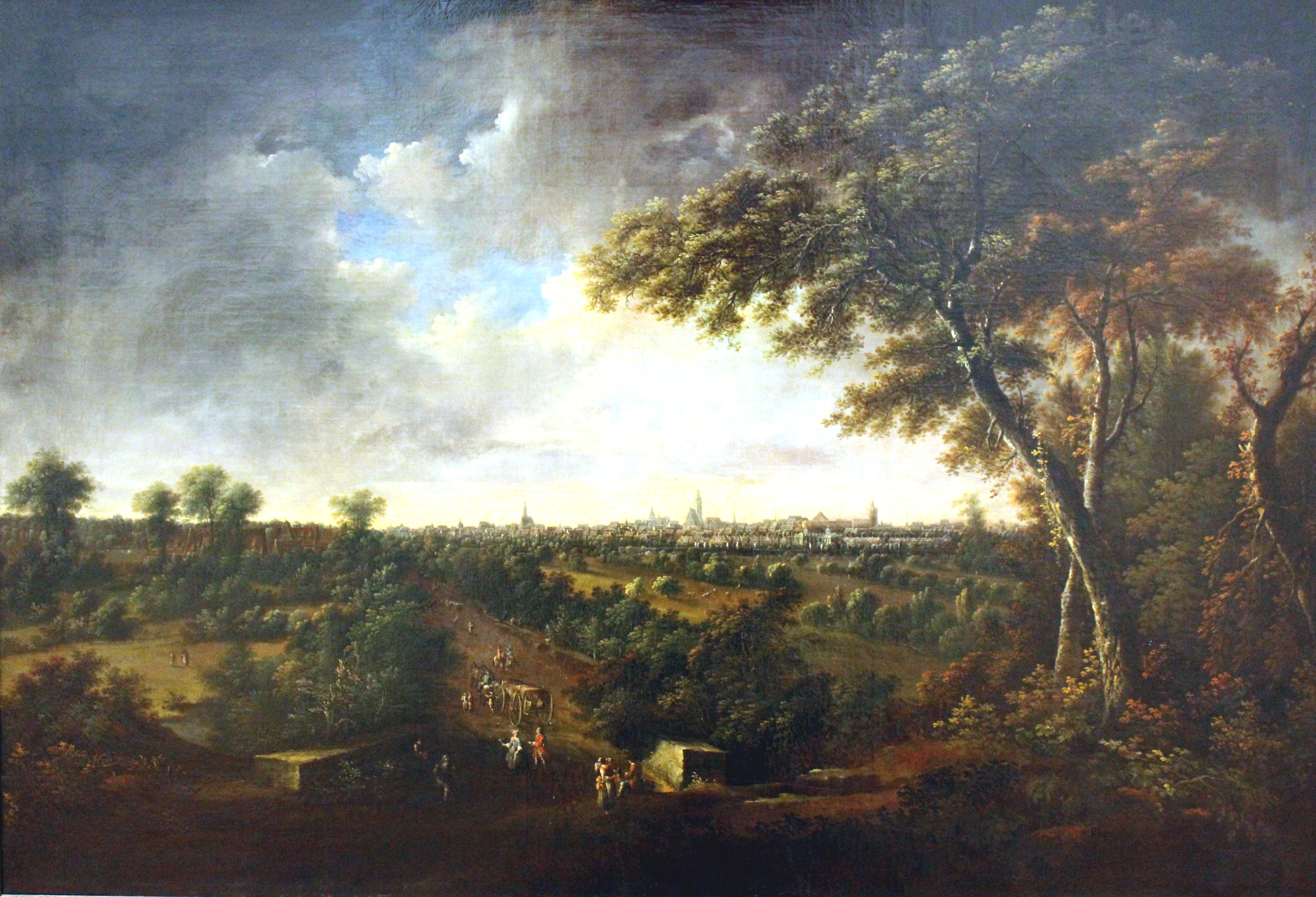
In this painting by Johann Alexander Thiele, View from Lindenau to Leipzig, from 1740, the extensive area of today's locality of Zentrum-West is still undeveloped.

Zentrum-West is one of the 63 localities into which Leipzig was administratively divided in 1992. It belongs to the borough Leipzig-Mitte and has the serial number 04.

== Location ==
In the north, the locality of Zentrum-West is bordered by Jahnallee and Ranstädter Steinweg, in the east by the Inner City Ring Road (Goerdelerring and Dittrichring). In the south, part of the Johannapark and the Clara-Zetkin-Park still belong to the locality of Zentrum-West. The southern border runs in a straight line along Karl-Tauchnitz-Strasse and Anton-Bruckner-Allee in the park to the Saxons' Bridge (Sachsenbrücke), which leads over the Elster flood channel (Elsterflutbett). The Elster flood channel borders the locality together with the Elster basin (Elsterbasin) to the north in the west.

== Location characteristics ==
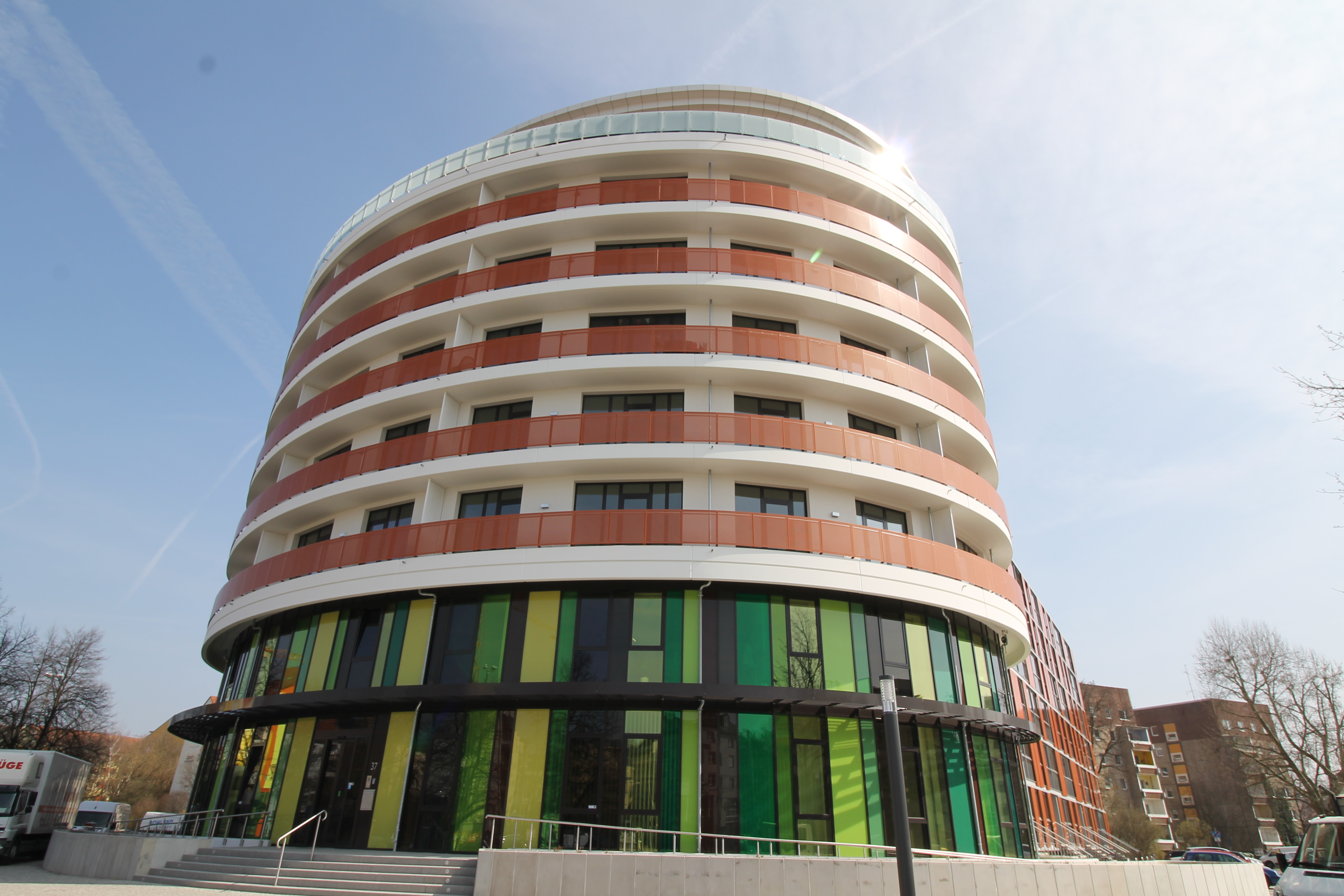
New building on Westplatz (corporate headquarters of the housing cooperative Unitas)

Although located directly at the gates of the city, the area of Zentrum-West was undeveloped for a long time. It was characterized by floodplains of the Elster and Pleiße rivers. The meadows offered themselves as pastureland, while the alluvial forests were used for the timber industry and the waters for fishing. The engineers Kohl and Georgi developed a river regulation plan from 1852 to 1854. As a result, today's locality of Zentrum-West could be drained. In order to be able to cultivate the swampy meadows, 60,000 cubic metres (2,100,000 cu ft) of earth had to be filled in, countless locks had to be created, roads had to be built and bridges had to be built. Until the beginning of the 20th century, the current locality was built upon.

The western part, the Bachviertel, still offers the image of a closed Wilhelminian style development. In the Innere Westvorstadt as the eastern part of Zentrum-West, the townscape is more heterogeneous. The two areas are separated by Friedrich-Ebert-Strasse (formerly: Weststrasse), which crosses the locality in a south–north direction about in the middle. Directly west of the inner city ring, large-format buildings were erected comparatively early in the 19th century on the Pleiße mill race (Pleißemühlgraben), and after the parcelling out of gardens such as Reichel's Garden, development continued in the adjoining areas in the rest of the 19th century. Käthe-Kollwitz-Strasse (formerly: Plagwitzer Strasse) crosses the district in an east–west direction. The square where Friedrich-Ebert-Strasse and Käthe-Kollwitz-Strasse intersect is called Westplatz (West square) and is located approximately in the middle of the Zentrum-West locality.

Käthe-Kollwitz-Strasse and Friedrich-Ebert-Strasse, as the largest streets in the area, are also tram lines. The street Jahnallee / Ranstädter Steinweg on the northern border of the locality was already part of a long-distance trade route, the Via Regia, in the Middle Ages. Today it is also a tram line. On the western border of the locality, the Zeppelin Bridge and the Klinger Bridge provide the connection for the tram and motorised private transport to the districts further west. The bridge over the Palmengarten weir and The Saxons' Bridge do the same for pedestrian and bicycle traffic.

On the 5 June 2026, the newly built Leipzig City Harbour was opened in the locality.

== Population ==
The number of residents with their main residence in the locality of Zentrum-West has developed as follows since 2000:

Year	Residents
2000	6,594
2005	7,946
2010	9,026
2015	10,605
2020	11,139
2024	11,599

The number of residents was comparatively low in the 1990s. The building stock was renovated until the 2000s. There was a funding program for this, and special depreciation could also be used, as many buildings are on the list of monuments. With the general increase in population of Leipzig and the special location of the locality Zentrum-West then filled up with residents in a short time.

== Schools ==
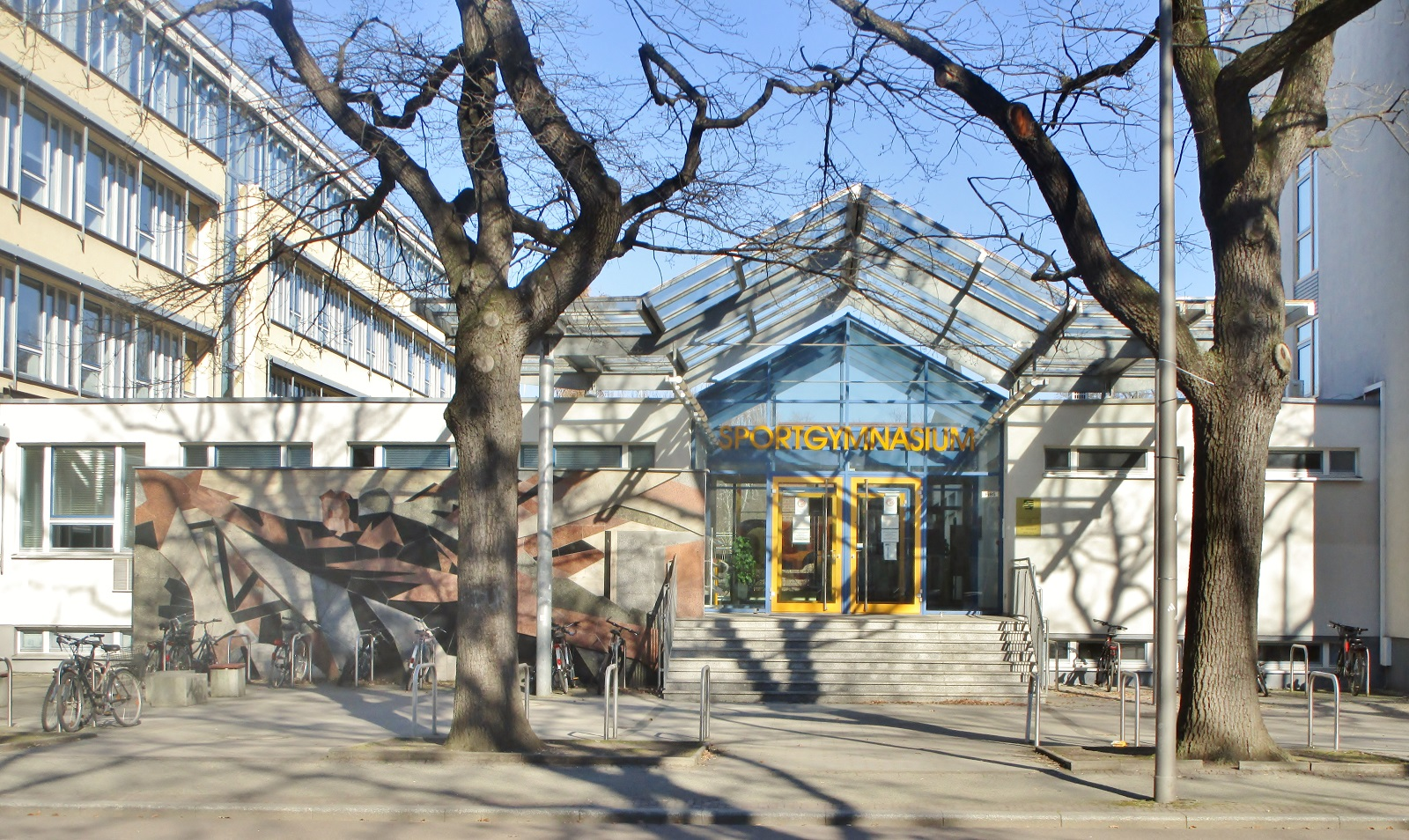
Landesgymnasium für Sport Leipzig

In the locality of Zentrum-West there are the following schools:

- St. Thomas School
- Landesgymnasium für Sport Leipzig
- Primary School Forum Thomanum
- Anna-Magdalena-Bach-Schule – Primary School of the City of Leipzig
- Lessingschule – Primary School of the City of Leipzig

== Museums ==
- Kunsthalle der Sparkasse Leipzig
- German Allotment Gardener Museum (Deutsches Kleingärtnermuseum)
- Saxon Psychiatric Museum

== Politics ==
The 2025 German federal election had the following result in terms of second votes in Zentrum-West (voter turnout 87.5%):

Party	Zentrum-West	City of Leipzig
SPD	12.4%	10.7%
Bündnis 90/Die Grünen	23.1%	13.6%
Die Linke	21.6%	22.5%
AfD	12.0%	21.9%
CDU	16.5%	16.6%
FDP	4.6 %	3.2 %
BSW	6.2 %	7.4 %
Others	3.5 %	4.1 %

== Further information ==
In addition to the Bachviertel and the Innere Westvorstadt, the area west of Friedrich-Ebert-Strasse and north of Käthe-Kollwitz-Strasse to Jahnallee is also relevant. In particular, the facilities of the former Deutsche Hochschule für Körperkultur (Sport University of East Germany), today the Sports Faculty of the Leipzig University, are located here. On this site is also the HHL Leipzig Graduate School of Management.

The "first allotment association in Germany", the KGV Dr. Schreber e.V., is located here with the Deutsches Kleingärtnermuseum (German Allotment Gardener Museum).
