= Saints Bridge (Leipzig) =

Footbridge in Leipzig, Germany

Saints Bridge Heilige Brücke
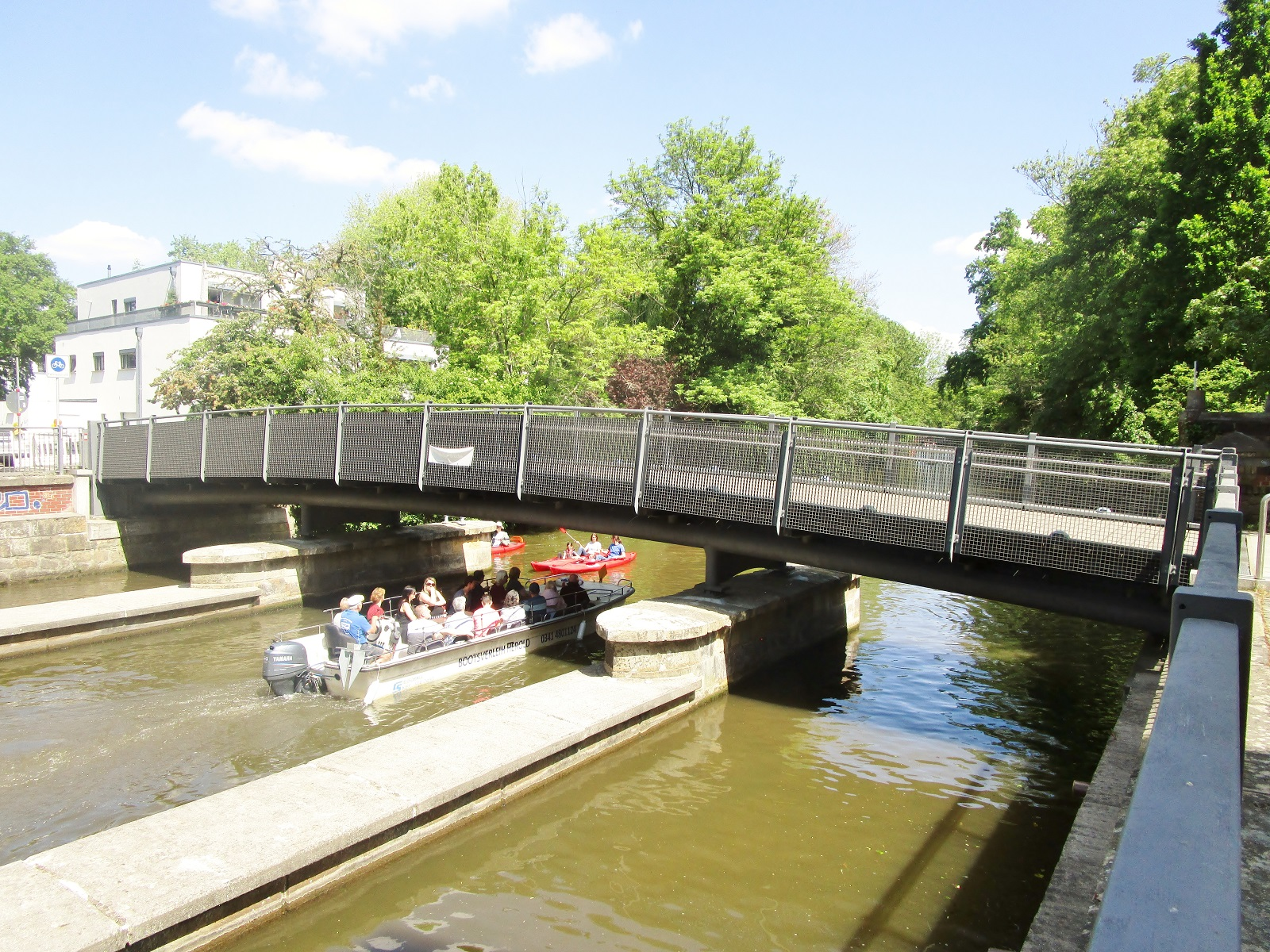
- Saints Bridge in 2022
- Coordinates: 51°20′06″N 12°21′13″E
- Carries: cyclists, pedestrians
- Crosses: White Elster
- Locale: Zentrum-West, Leipzig,Germany
- Preceded by: Peterssteg
- Followed by: Marschnerbrücke

Characteristics
- Design: Steel arch bridge
- Width: 4.5 metres (15 ft)
- Height: 25 metres (82 ft)
- Design life: Original timber bridge (at least 1806–2003); Modern bridge (2003–present)

History
- Engineering design by: Bernd Sikora
- Opened: 2003; 23 years ago

Location
- Interactive map of Saints Bridge

The Saints Bridge (German: Heilige Brücke) is a bridge for cyclists and pedestrians in Leipzig. It crosses the Elstermühlgraben, which utilises the old course of the White Elster.

== Location and Design ==
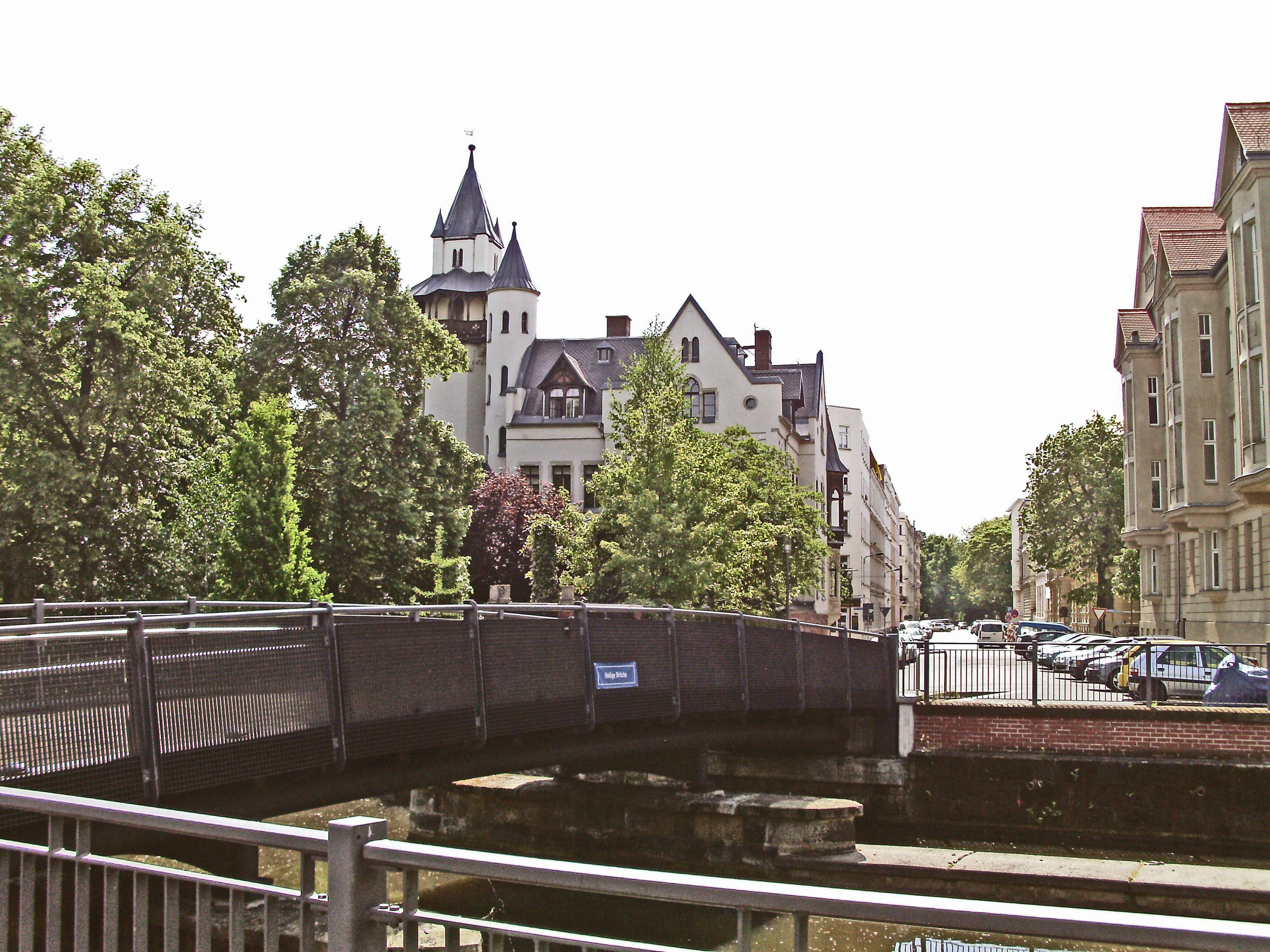
Saints Bridge with a view of Moschelesstraße and the Villa zur Julburg (2012)

Saints Bridge connects Moschelesstraße with Am Elsterwehr street in Leipzig's Bachviertel neighbourhood in the Zentrum-West locality. The bridge before it on the Elstermühlgraben is the Peterssteg, the bridge after it is the Marschnerbrücke.

Saints Bridge is a steel arch bridge 25 metres (82.0 feet) long and 4.5 metres (14.8 feet ) wide. In addition to the bank supports, it has two supports. The flooring is plastic, which is illuminated by floor spotlights integrated into the railings. Supply lines run along the underside of the bridge. The railings consist of a latticework with an upper safety tube and a handrail.

== History ==
The site of the modern bridge is over an older wooden bridge over the Elster to the meadows to the west of Leipzig. On a map from 1806, the bridge already bore its current name. Still a wooden footbridge at the time, it has since been renovated several times, the last time at the beginning of the 2000s. The steel arch bridge described above was completed in 2003 according to the plans of the architect Bernd Sikora.

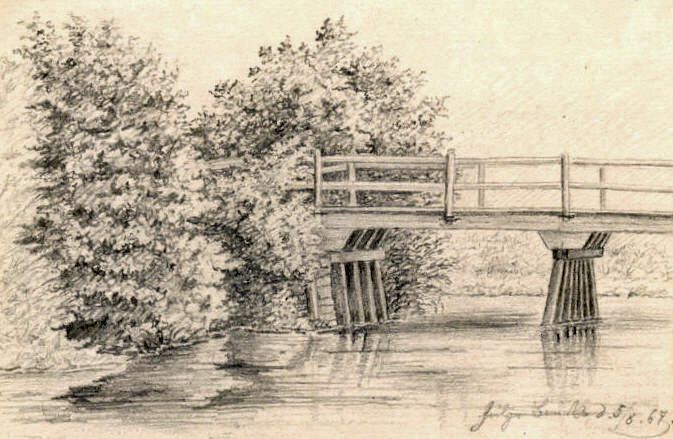
Depiction of the original wooden Saints Bridge 1867

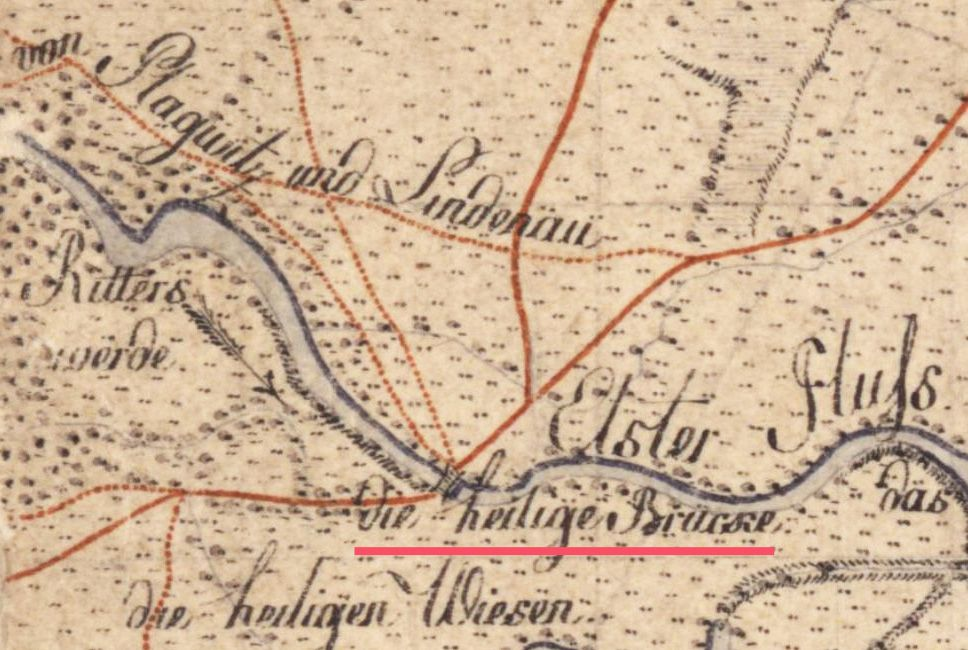
The Saints Bridge on a map in 1806

== Local Legend ==
The name of the bridge is linked to a Leipzig legend of Ferdinand Backhaus and was probably first written down in 1844 in his book Sagen der Stadt Leipzig (transl. Legends of the City of Leipzig). Other versions come from Johann Georg Theodor Grässe (1855) and Jürgen Friedel in Leipzig-Lese.

The story is as follows:

After praying to God for children a merchant couple had twins which they named Maria and Katharina with the mother dying soon after in child birth. To fulfill a promise his late wife had made, the father chose to send a child to the Leipzig Cistercian convent of St George that child would be Maria while Katharina was sent to live with relatives. Five years later, the sisters would meet again and upon hearing of Maria's brutal conditions in the convent Katharina decided to help her escape which succeeded. Soon after Katharina would refuse to an arranged marriage and would flee to live with her lover this caused the enraged fiancé, made cuckold, to search for Katharina and he found her seeking refuge at Thomas Monastery. He proceed to mislead the monastery into believing Katharina was not who she claimed and was actually the escaped nun Maria. Thus, Katharina was put on trial in her twin sister's place but rather than reveal the truth ,out of love, she took upon herself the sentence for a crime she hadn't committed and was given the death penalty. The sentence was carried out by tying her feet to a large stone and drowning her at the site of the bridge. When Maria who was hiding in the cow tower learnt of her sister's sacrifice, she visited the bridge every evening to pray and slowly she loses her will to live and was one day found dead near the bridge. Soon the story of sisterly love was praised across the city forcing the monastery to award them an honorable burial and the two were spoken of as saints, hence the name of the bridge.
