= Walter Cramer =

German businessman

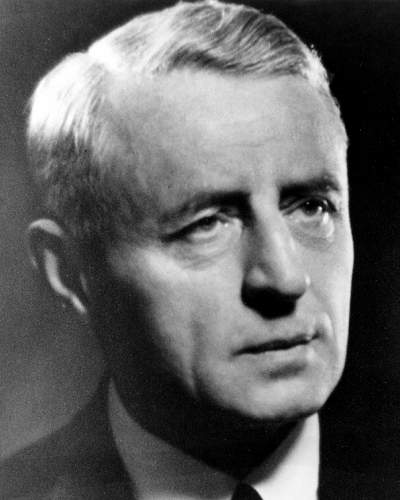
- Born: Wilhelm Bernardo Walter Cramer; 1 May 1886; Leipzig, German Empire
- Died: 14 November 1944 (aged 58); Plötzensee Prison, Berlin, Nazi Germany
- Cause of death: Execution by hanging

Wilhelm Bernardo Walter Cramer (1 May 1886 – 14 November 1944) was a German businessman from Leipzig and a member of the failed 20 July Plot to assassinate Adolf Hitler at the Wolf's Lair in East Prussia.

== Life ==
In 1919, Cramer became managing director of the Kammgarnspinnerei Gautzsch AG, a worsted yarn spinning mill. From 1923, he was on the board of directors of the Leipziger Kammgarnspinnerei Stöhr & Co. AG, another corporation in the same industry. In the first half of the 1940s, Cramer took part in civilian resistance against the Nazi régime with Leipzig's former mayor Carl Friedrich Goerdeler (1884-1945). After the attempt on the Führer's life failed on 20 July 1944, Cramer was seized on 22 July, and later found guilty at the Volksgerichtshof of treason and high treason, for which he was sentenced to death. He was hanged at Plötzensee Prison in Berlin on 14 November 1944.

== Honours ==
In 1945, a street in the Gohlis neighbourhood of Leipzig was named Walter-Cramer-Straße after him. The City of Leipzig also honoured Walter Cramer with a monument in the Johannapark in 1996.
