= Julburg =

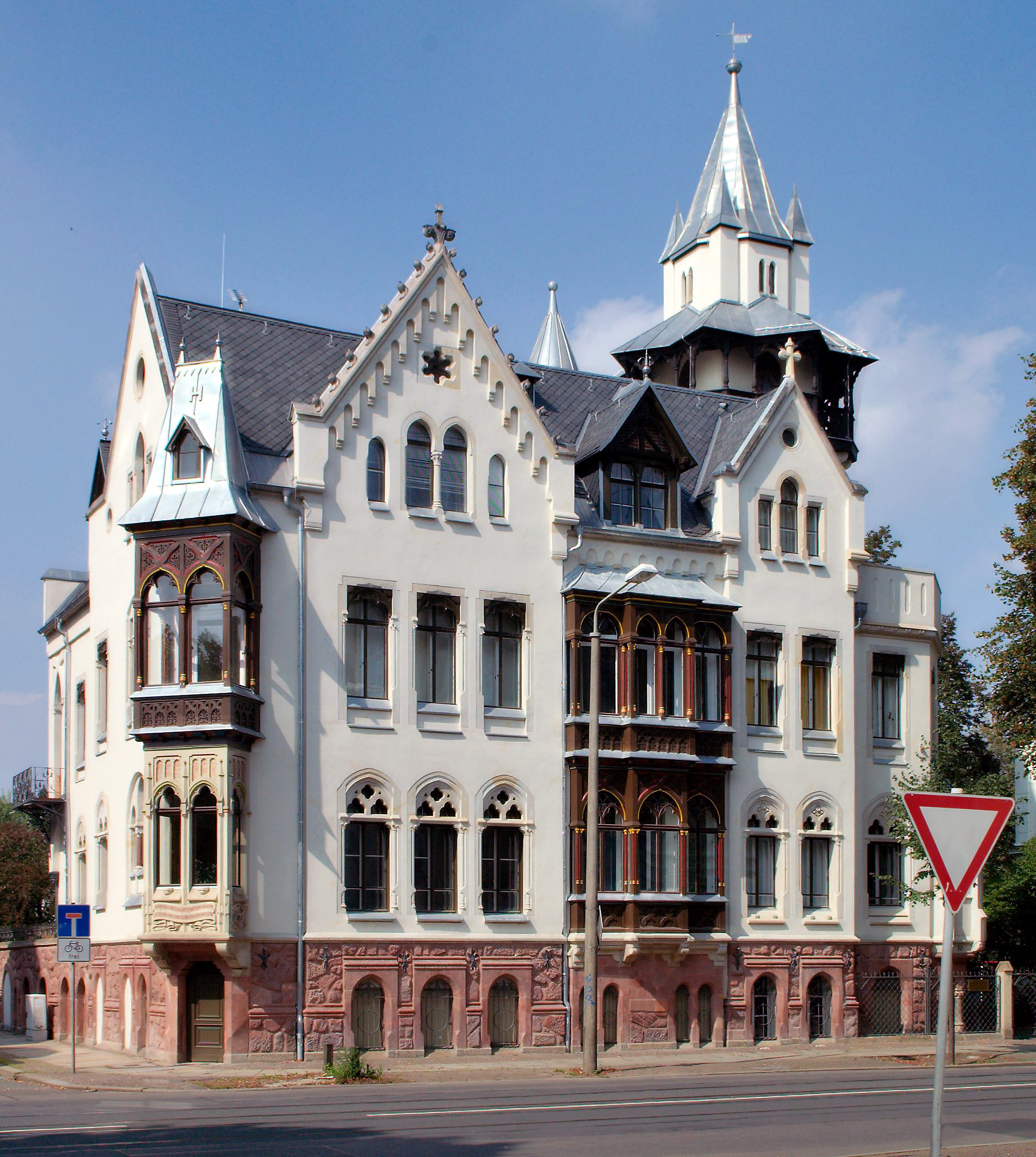
- Julburg seen from Käthe-Kollwitz-Strasse
- Interactive map of the Julburg area

General information
- Type: Villa
- Architectural style: Historicism
- Location: Bachviertel, Käthe-Kollwitz-Strasse 70, Leipzig, Germany
- Coordinates: 51.334786°N 12.354144°E
- Completed: 1874
- Renovated: 1993–1996

Technical details
- Floor count: 3

Design and construction
- Architect: Oskar Mothes

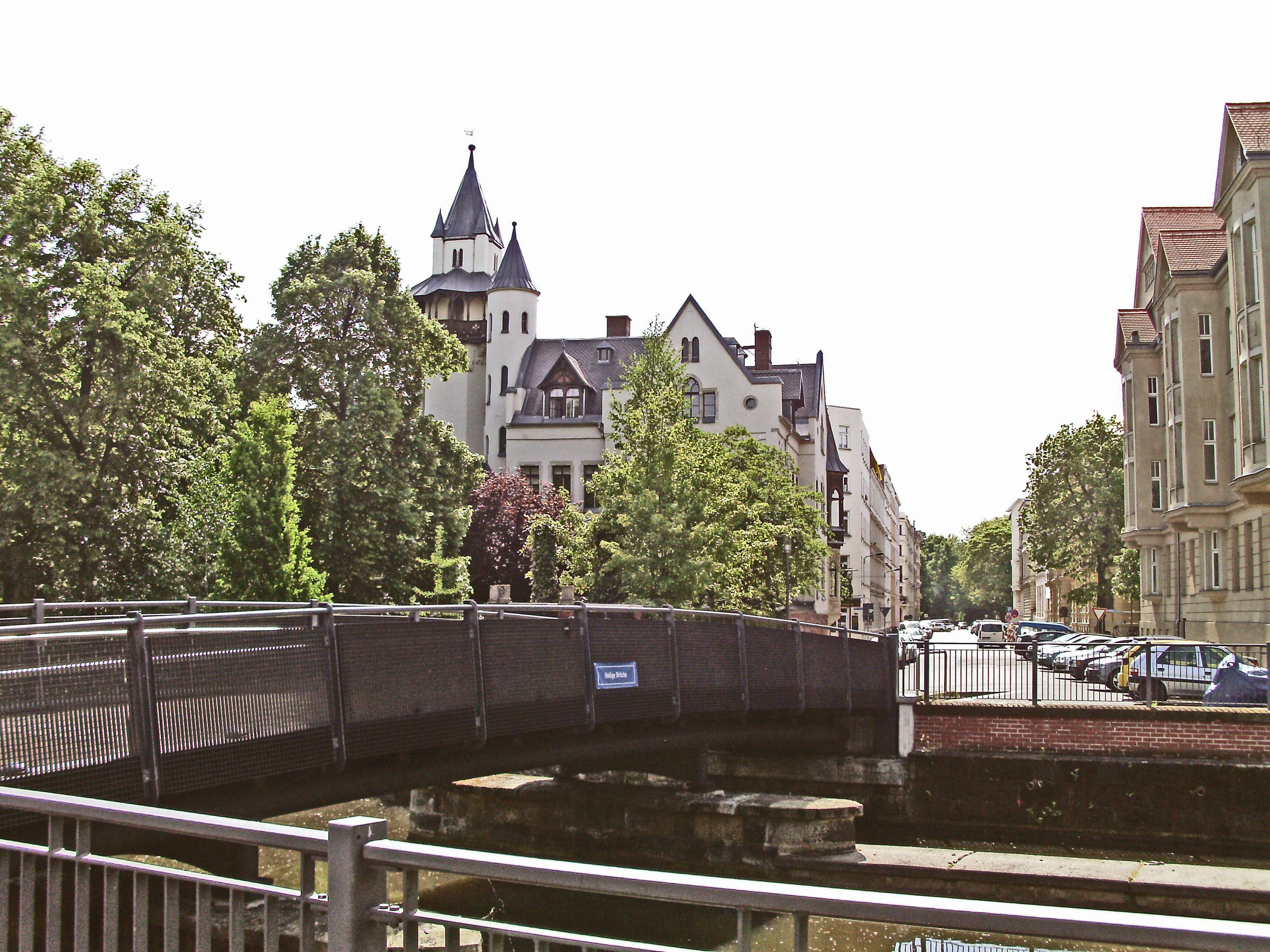
The back of the "Julburg" seen from the Saints Bridge over the Elstermühlgraben

The listed villa Julburg (English: Yule Castle) in the Bachviertel in Leipzig, Germany, is considered one of the most beautiful buildings of historicism and was the residence of the architect Oskar Mothes.

== Description ==
The villa, built in 1873/74 at Plagwitzer Strasse 38, later Helfferichstrasse, now Käthe-Kollwitz-Strasse 70, in the historicising neo-Gothic style – presumably according to plans by Oskar Mothes himself – was named "Julburg" by the architect after his wife. Mothes had his design office in the house, while the printer and publisher Otto Dürr lived on the ground floor with his wife (a sister of Oskar Mothes). The villa has an English-style garden.

The following inscriptions are found on the house:

Erbauet A. D. 1878 Baurath O. Mothes. Built A. D. 1878 Baurath O. Mothes.

Meyn Haus, steh fest, kehr dich nit dran, wenn dich auch tadelt manch eyn Mann. My house, stand firm, don't turn to it, even if many a man rebukes you.

Gott schütze diesen Bau / Julburg wird er genant / zu Ehr’n der besten Frau / im ganzen Sachsenland. God bless this building / it is called Julburg / in honour of the best woman / in all Saxony.

The striking appearance was achieved by greatly differing in the height of individual buildings. There is a large stair tower with a covered wooden walkway and a small round tower with a conical roof, which also contains a stair spindle. Porphyrystone enriches the plaster façade of the multi-part corner building. Inside, there are various stylistic quotations and built-in spolia, including painted wooden beam ceilings and leaded glass windows. The garden grotto has oil stencil paintings. The furnishings in the Neo-Gothic and Neo-Renaissance styles have been almost completely preserved. In the basement there is a "drinking hall" with a columned vault from the demolition of medieval village churches in the area.

The horse stable belonging to the villa was also built in 1908 in Gothic style.

In the years 1993–1996, the building was restored. From 1977 to 2001, it housed the premises for the museology course (until 1992 Institute of Museology, until 1988 Technical School for Museologists) in the Media Department of the Leipzig University of Applied Sciences. At present, it is again the residential building and headquarters of a law firm.

== Bibliography ==
- Dehio, Georg (1998). Handbuch der Deutschen Kunstdenkmäler. Sachsen II. Die Regierungsbezirke Leipzig und Chemnitz [Handbook of German Art Monuments. Saxony II. The Administrative Districts of Leipzig and Chemnitz (often referred to as the "Dehio Handbook")] (in German). Munich: Deutscher Kunstverlag. p. 542. ISBN 3-422-03048-4.
- Hocquél, Wolfgang (2023). Architekturführer Leipzig. Von der Romanik bis zur Gegenwart [Leipzig Architecture Guide: From Romanesque to the Present Day] (in German). Leipzig: Passage-Verlag. pp. 232–233. ISBN 978-3-95415-128-8.
- Mothes, Oscar (1878). "In welchem Stil sollen wir bauen?" [In what style should we build?]. quelle-optimal.de (in German). Berlin.
