= Bachviertel =

Area of Leipzig, Germany

Coordinates: 51.335405°N 12.357991°E

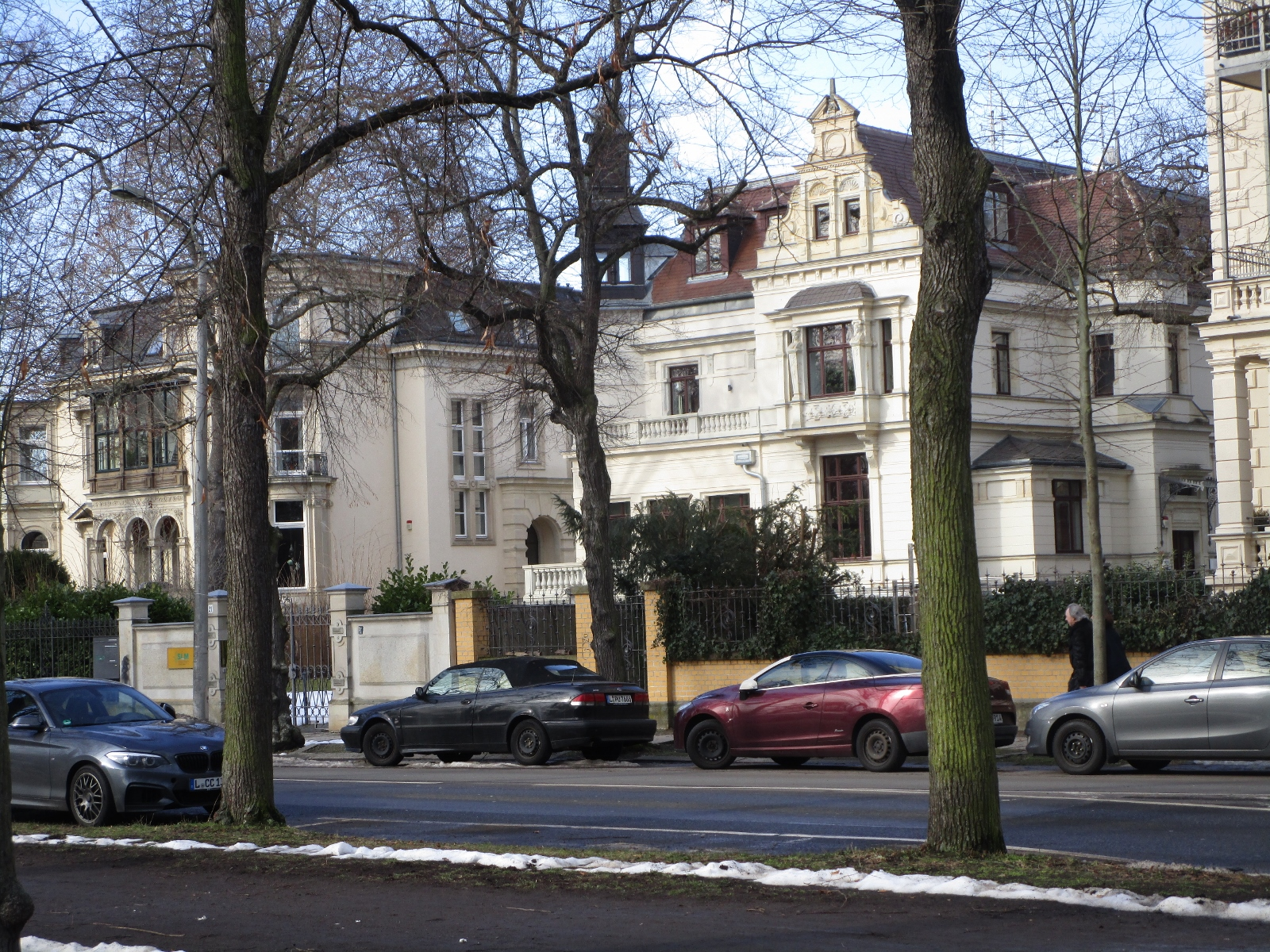
Musikbibliothek (Music library)

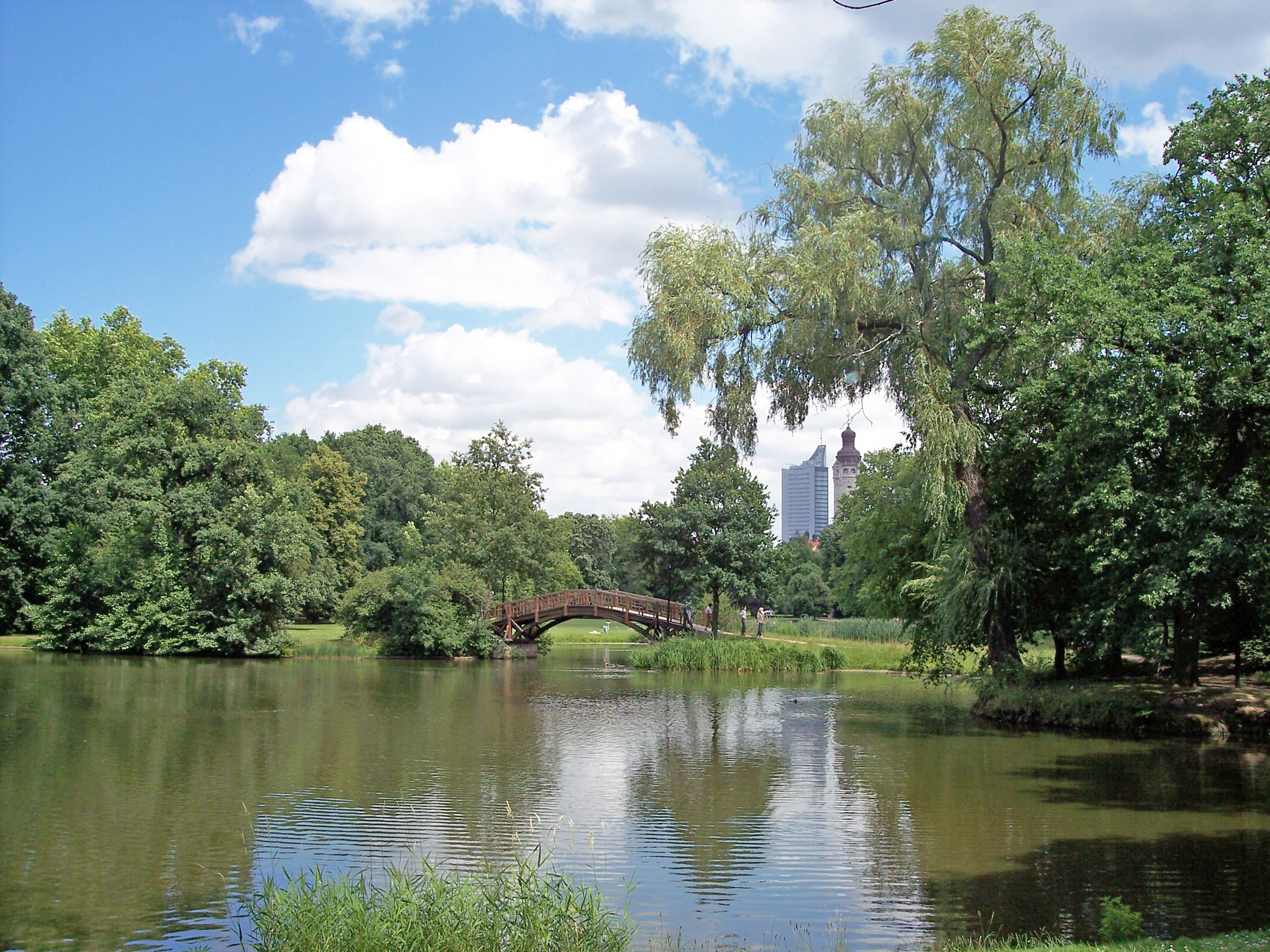
Johannapark

The Bachviertel (German pronunciation: [ˈbaxˌfɪʁtl̩], Bach Quarter), initially called "Viertel am Johannapark", is a Wilhelminian-style residential area in the west of Leipzig's borough Mitte in Saxony, Germany. According the administrative division of Leipzig, the Bachviertel is part of the locality Zentrum-West. It ist named after Johann Sebastian Bach.

The Bachviertel was built in the mid to late 19th century in the historic architectural style as an urban extension between Ferdinand-Lasalle-Strasse and Käthe-Kollwitz-Strasse and is considered to be particularly well preserved with its block development and its villas next to the Waldstraßenviertel. In particular, Leipzig's church music history is closely linked to the Bachviertel; it is home to the educational campus Forum Thomanum.

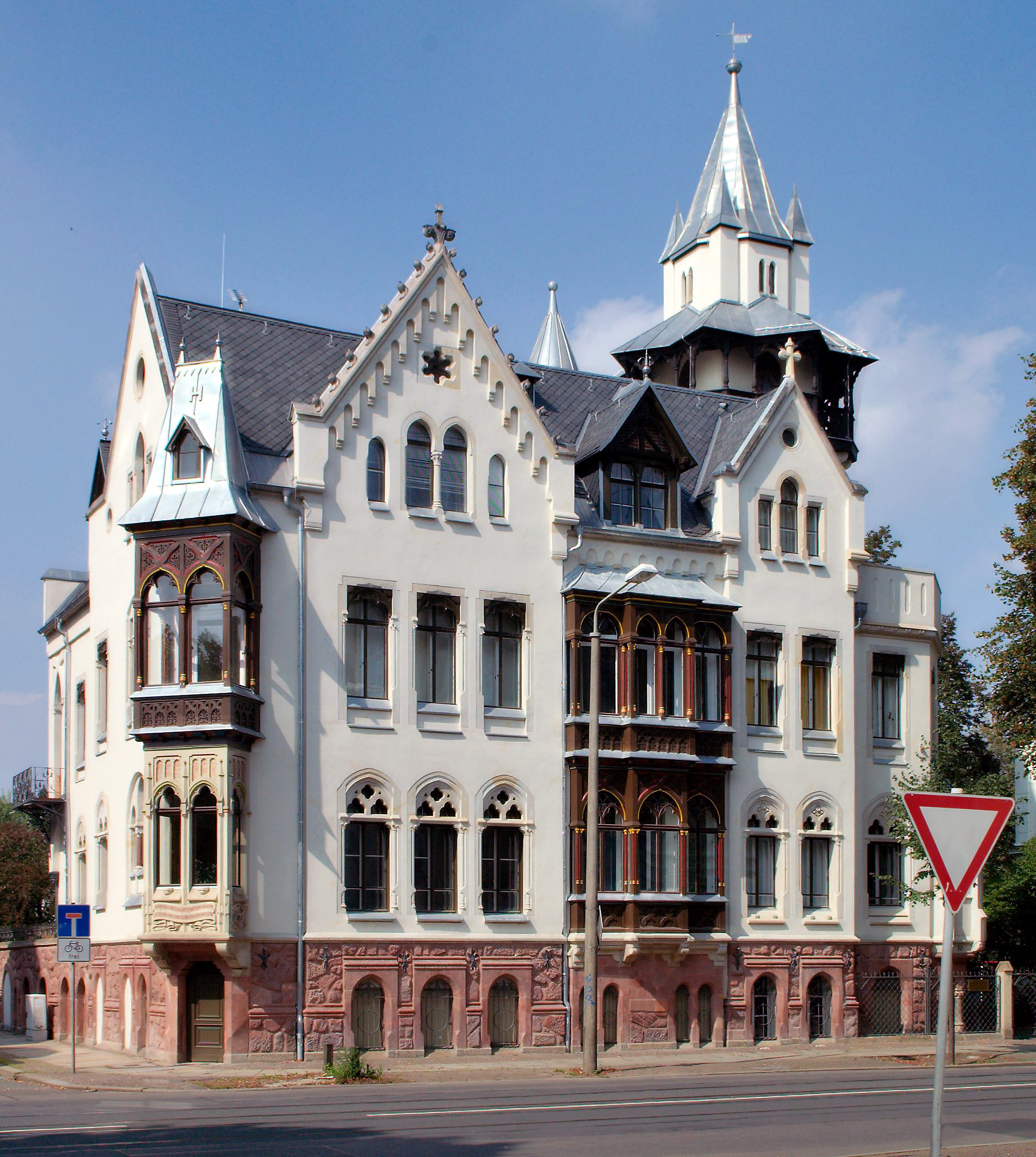
Villa ″Julburg″ at Käthe-Kollwitz-Strasse

== Development plan ==
The main reasons for the development of the Leipzig west and south vorstadts were flood protection measures within the framework of the Pleiße flood canal and the drainage of floodplain areas in the middle of the 19th century.

In 1870, a "southwestern Bebauungsplan" (land-use plan) and in 1877 an overall plan was presented, according to which two new urban areas, namely the Bach and the Music Quarter, were to be created. These were realized at the end of the 19th century in the parks Johannapark and King Albert (today part of the Clara-Zetkin-Park).

The Bachviertel was built as a residential area with perimeter blocks, with occasional commercial space in the courtyards. Two schools, namely the St. Thomas School and the ″IV. Bürgerschule″, and two churches, namely the Protestant Luther Church and the Anglican All Saints' Church, were planned as public facilities. The neighbourhood has a rectangular outline and stretches from the Alte Elster in the northwest across Ferdinand-Lassalle-Strasse (formerly Bismarckstrasse) in the southeast and Friedrich-Ebert-Strasse (formerly Weststrasse) in the northeast to the Elster flood basin in the southwest. A close coverage development was chosen, with representative apartment buildings of four and five storeys. Sebastian-Bach-Strasse forms a central main axis. Side streets lead from this into an open villa structure.

== Chronicle of the development ==
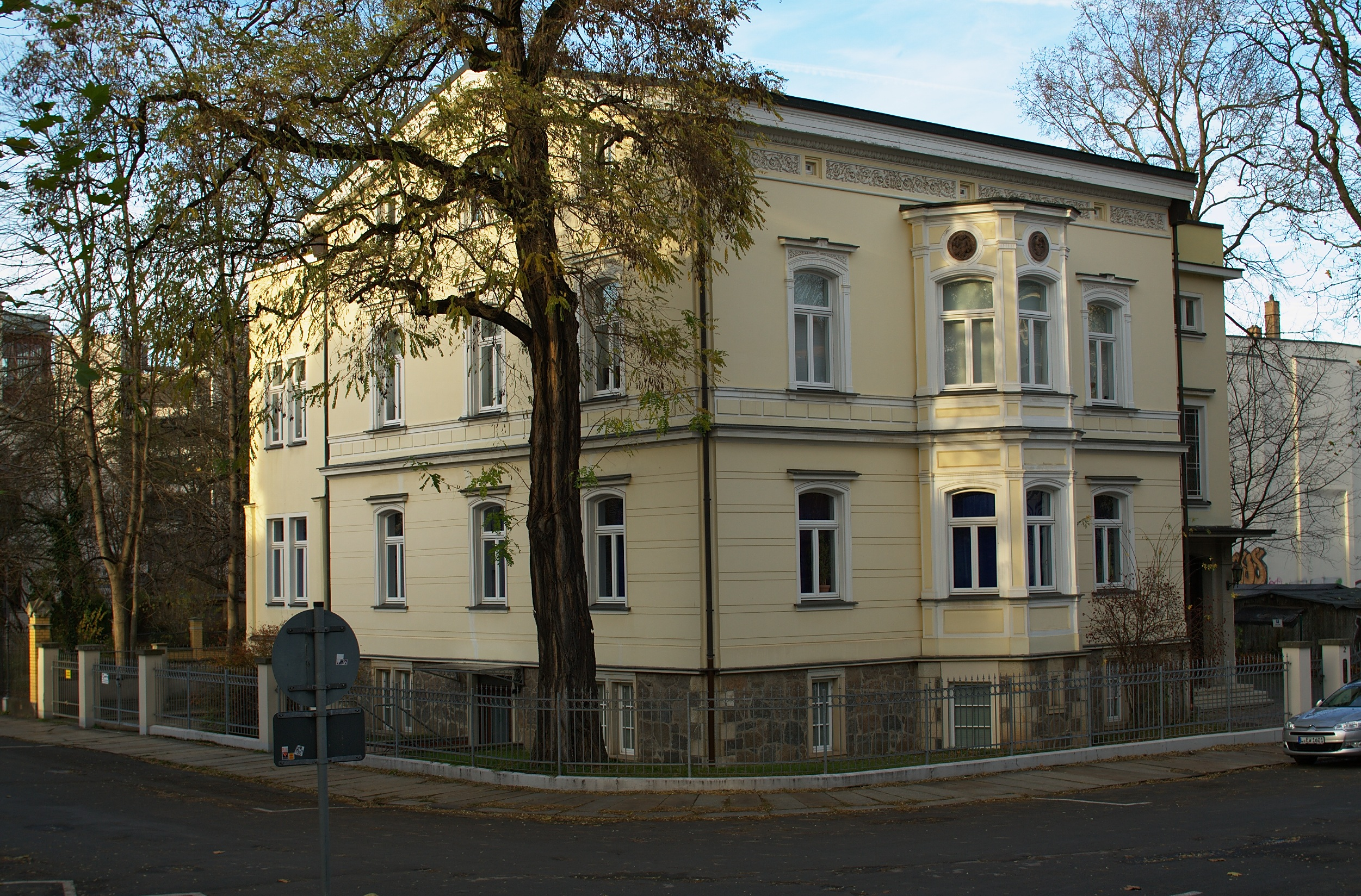
Gustav-Mahler-Strasse 2

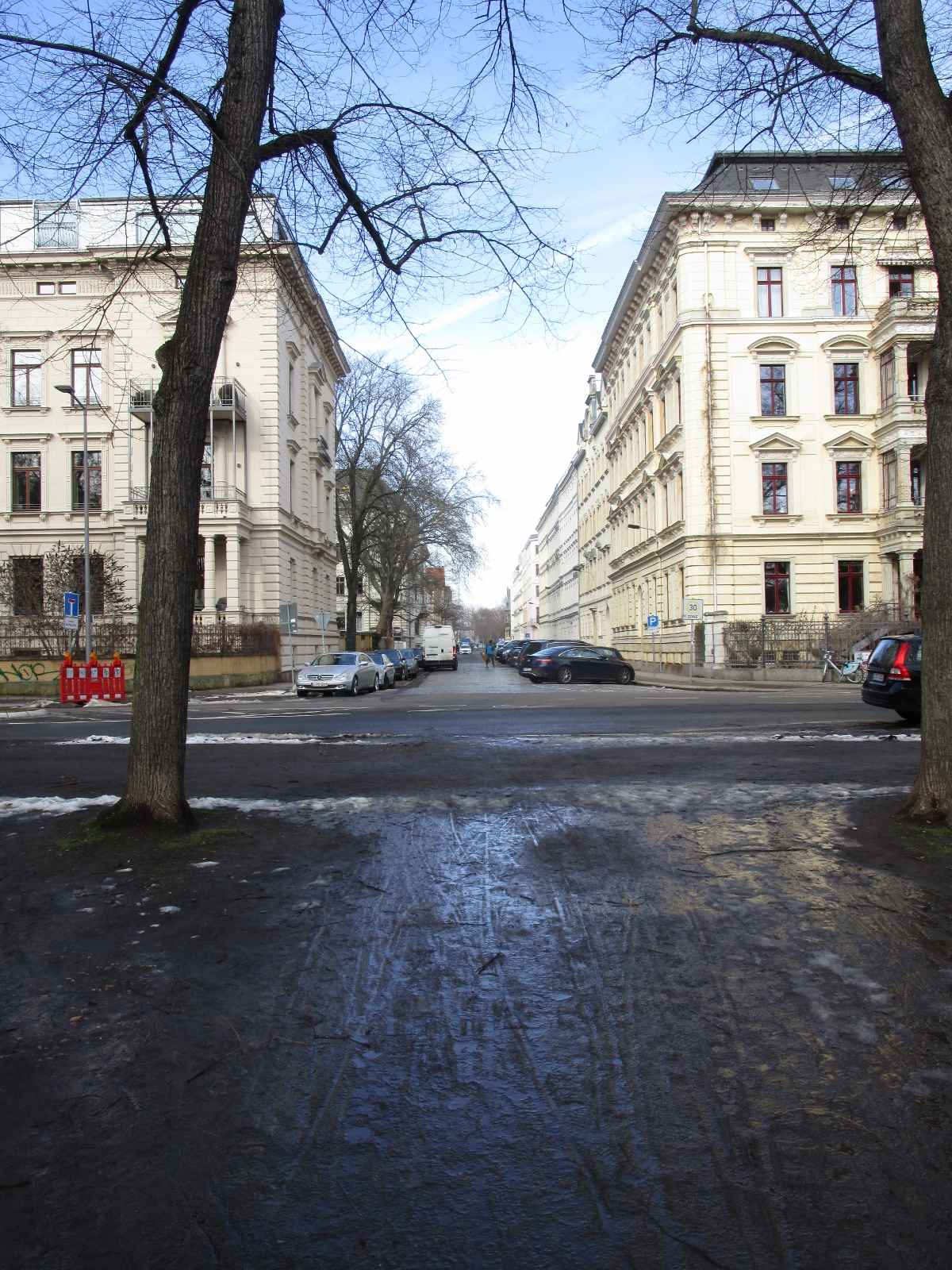
Moschelesstrasse

The original development of the neighbourhood took place in 1855 first at Gustav-Mahler-Strasse 2, near Schreberstrasse. In the 1870s, the areas of Moscheles and Hauptmannstrasse were developed. The first villas were built from 1870 onwards on the busy Käthe-Kollwitz-Strasse (formerly Plagwitzer Strasse), which connects Leipzig-Mitte with Lindenau and Plagwitz. That construction phase was completed in 1875.

The southern part of the district is considered to be “particularly impressive in terms of urban development”, as it was the site of a closed Gründerzeit development of middle-class residential buildings between 1881 and 1888, with magnificently designed facades and enclosed front gardens.

== Building gallery ==
Architecturally, the Villa Gebhardt (Arwed Roßbach 1880), the Villa Meyer and the Pommer House (Max Pommer 1886), the present-day Thomas School (Lüders 1879) – Viehweger's building from 1877 was destroyed in the World War II – and the Thomas Alumnat (August Friedrich Viehweger 1881), the present-day Villa Thomana (Max Pommer 1883) and the Luther Church (Julius Zeißig 1886) are particularly noteworthy.

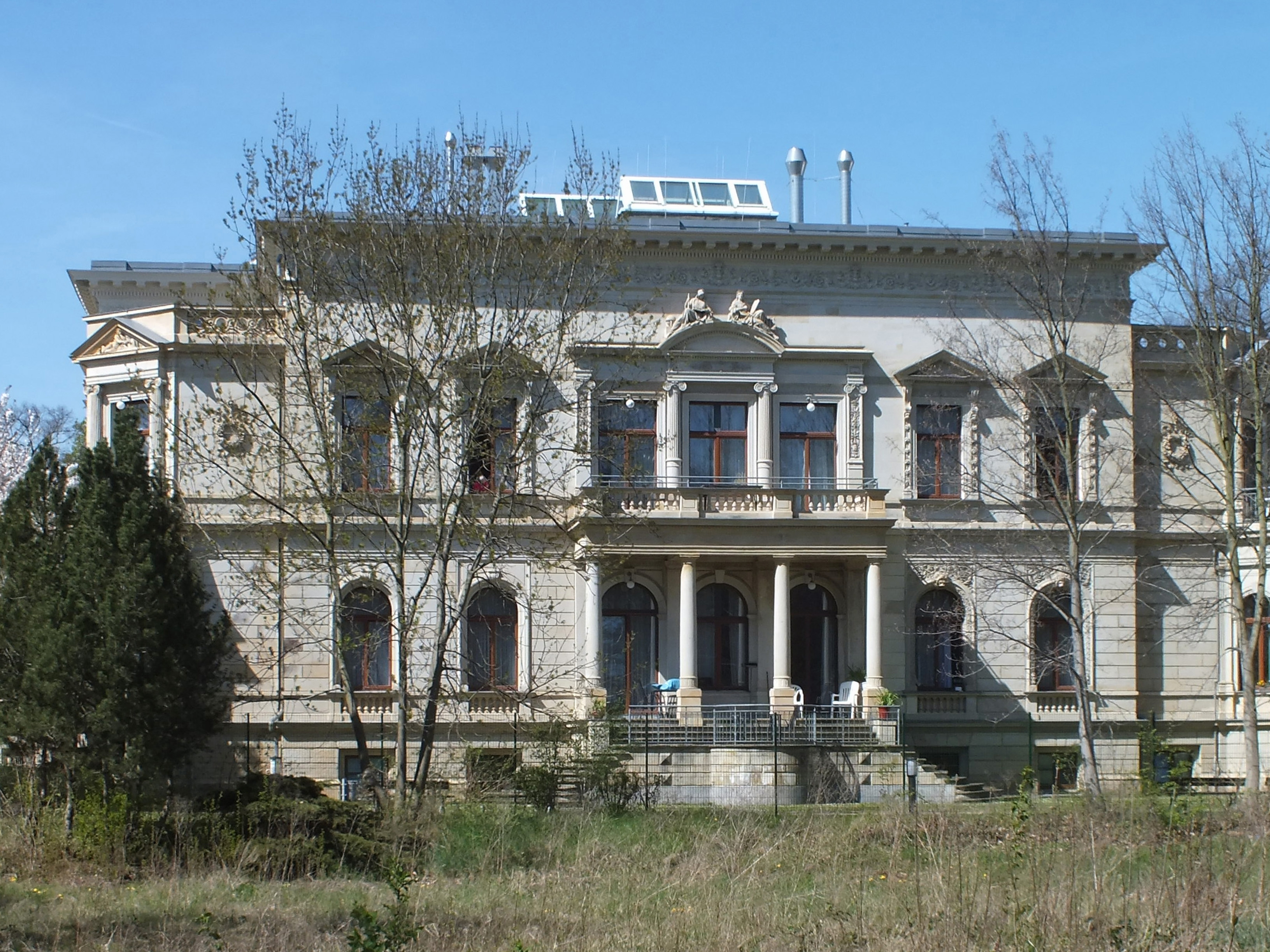
Villa Gebhardt

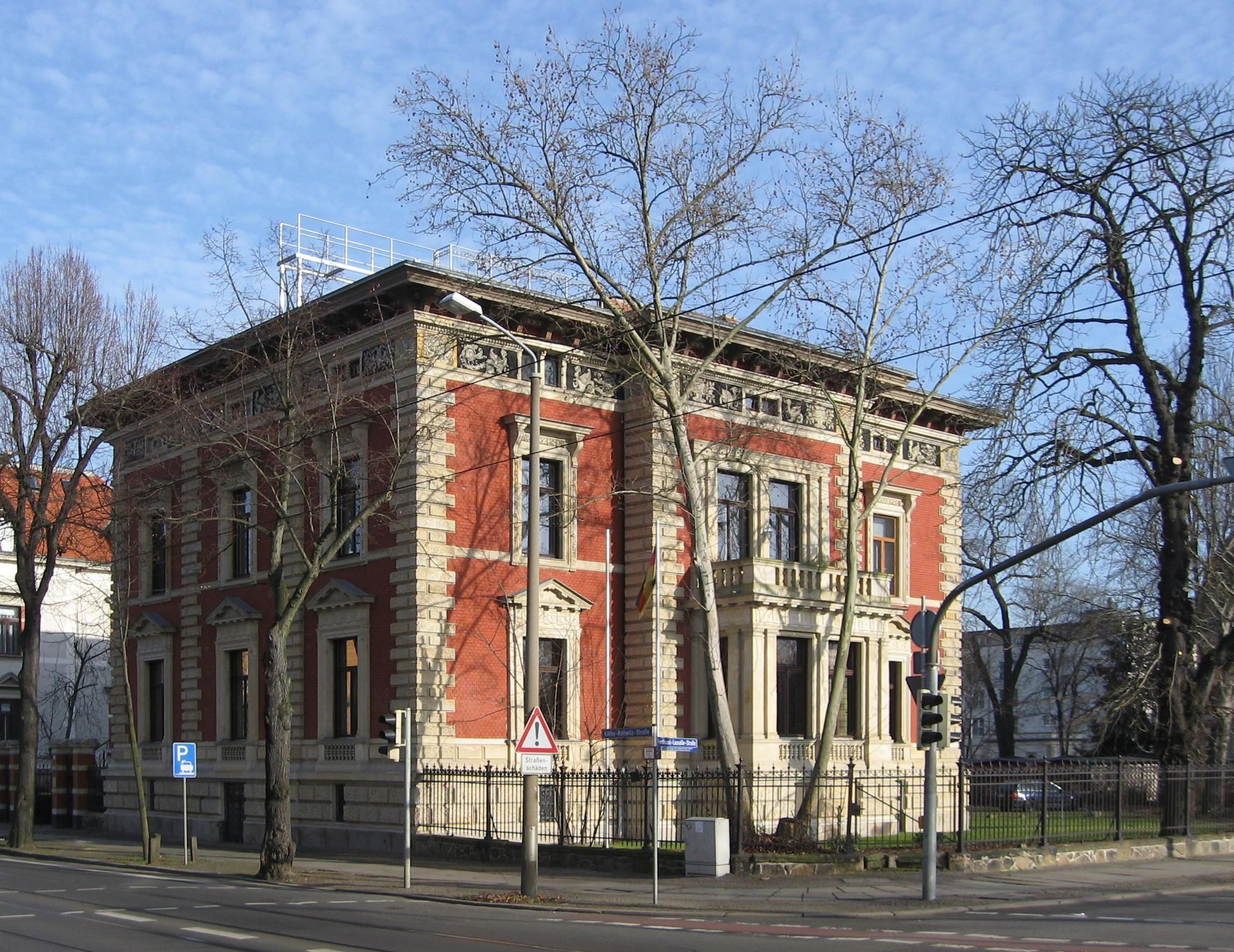
Villa Meyer

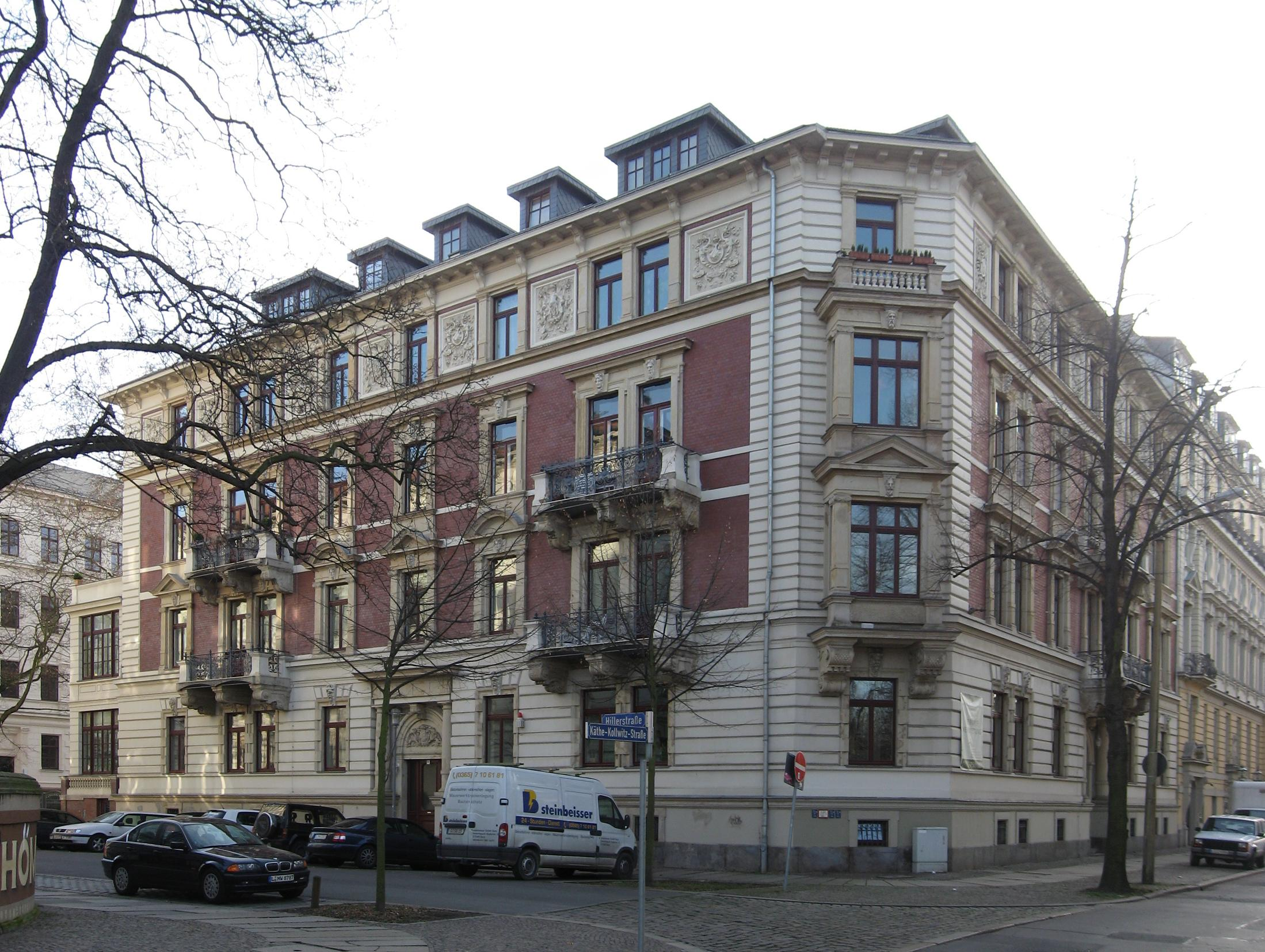
House Pommer

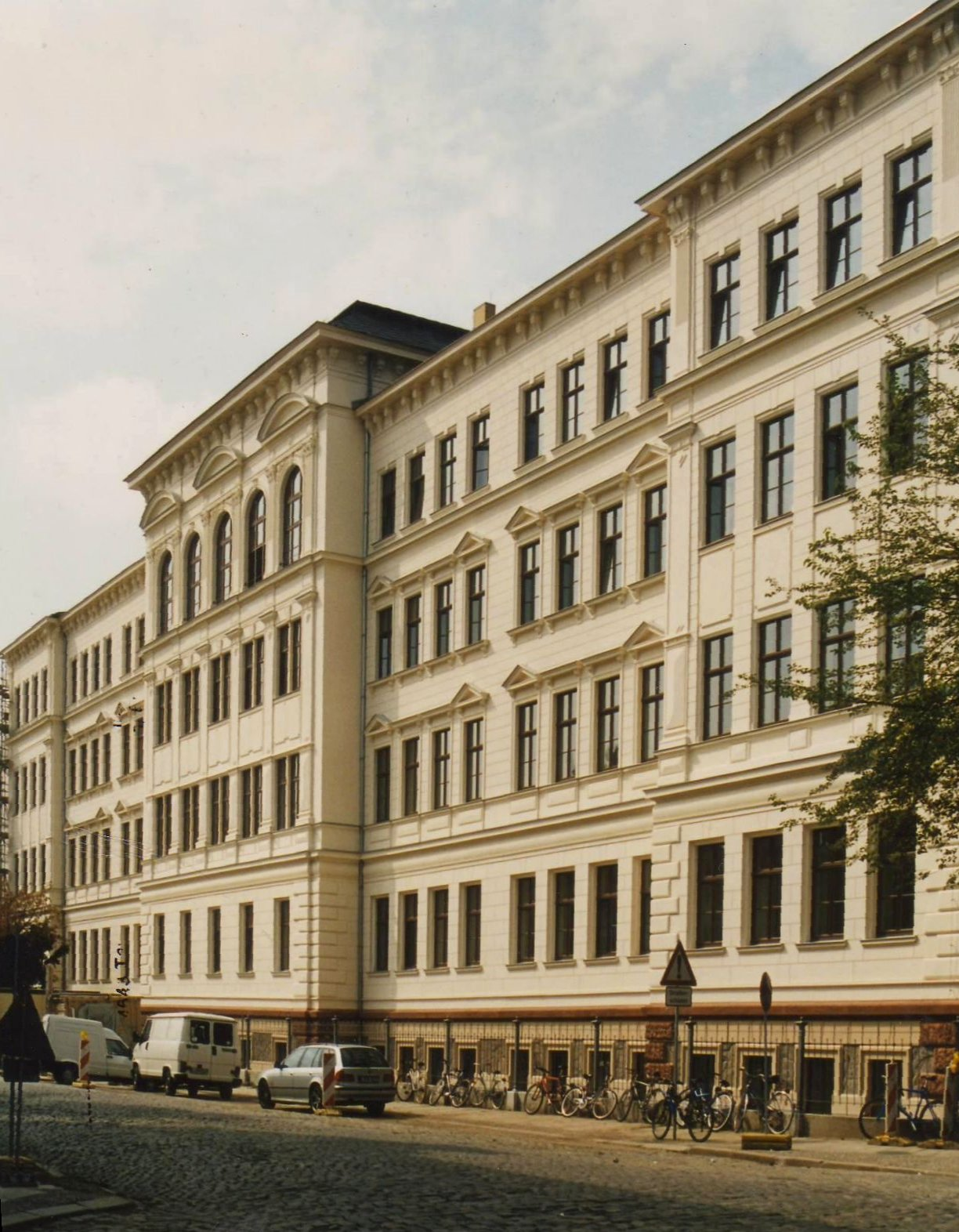
Today's Thomasschule

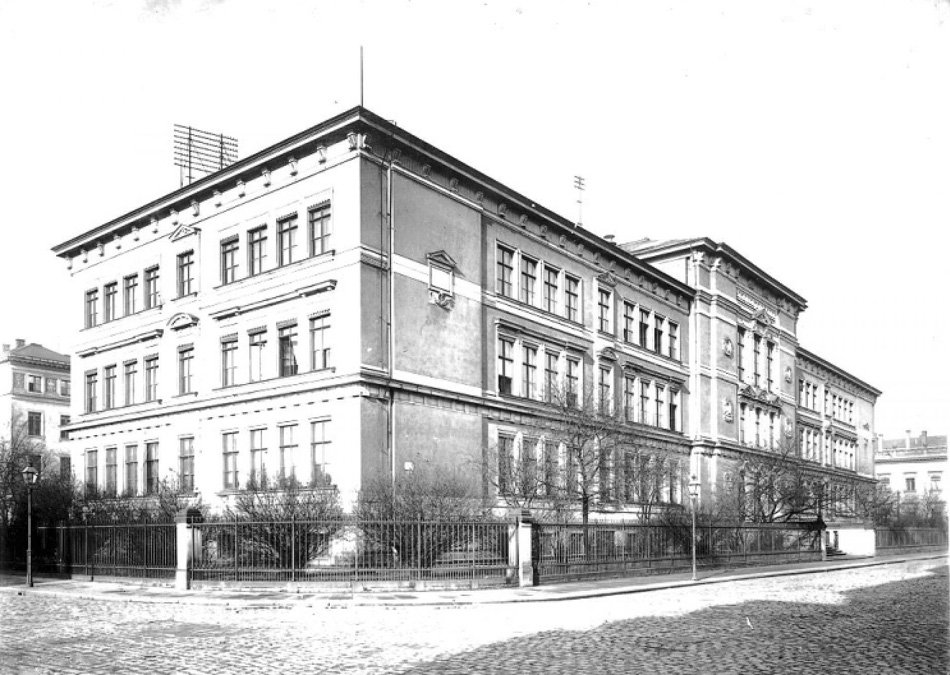
War-destroyed Thomasschule

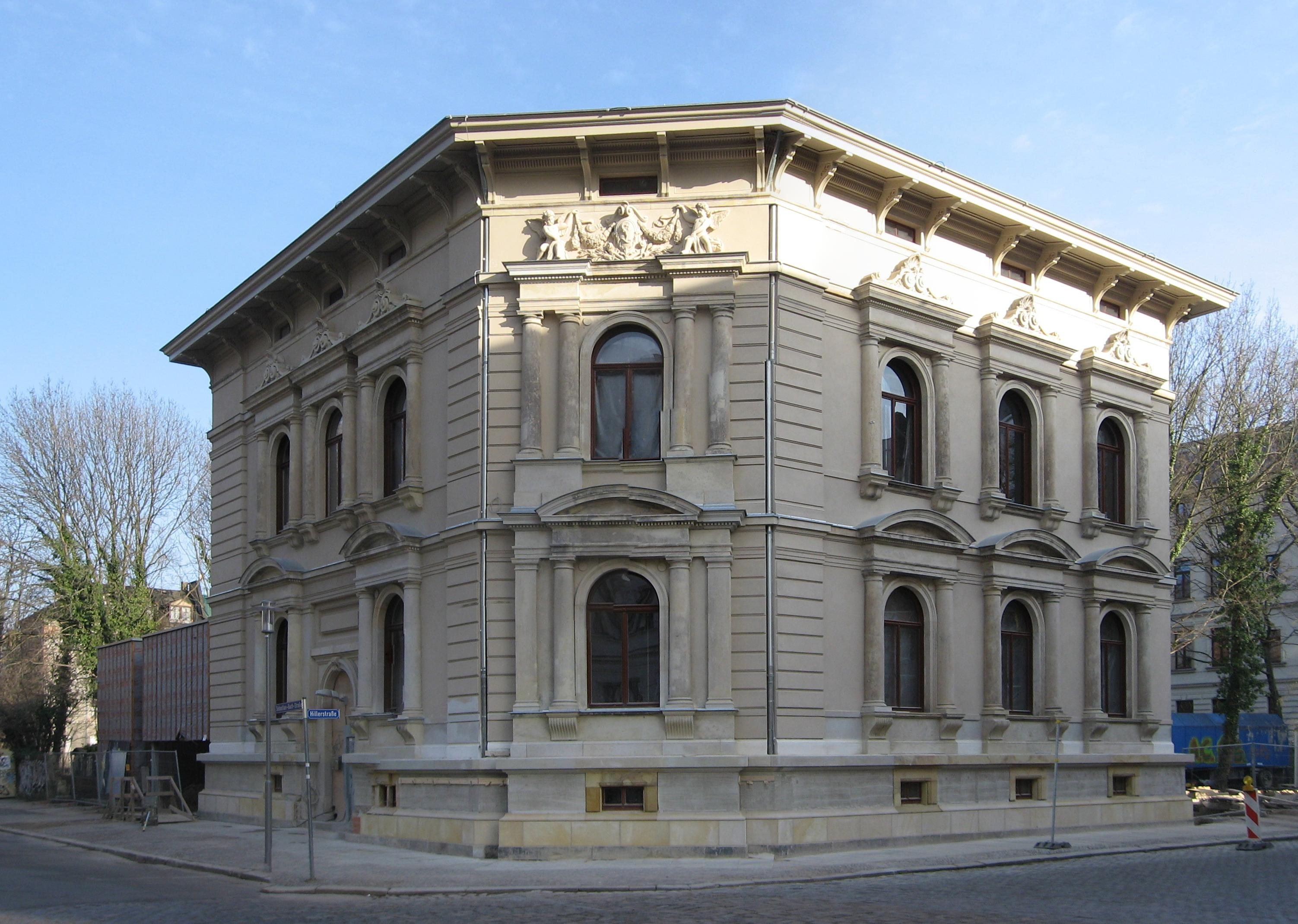
Today's Villa Thomana

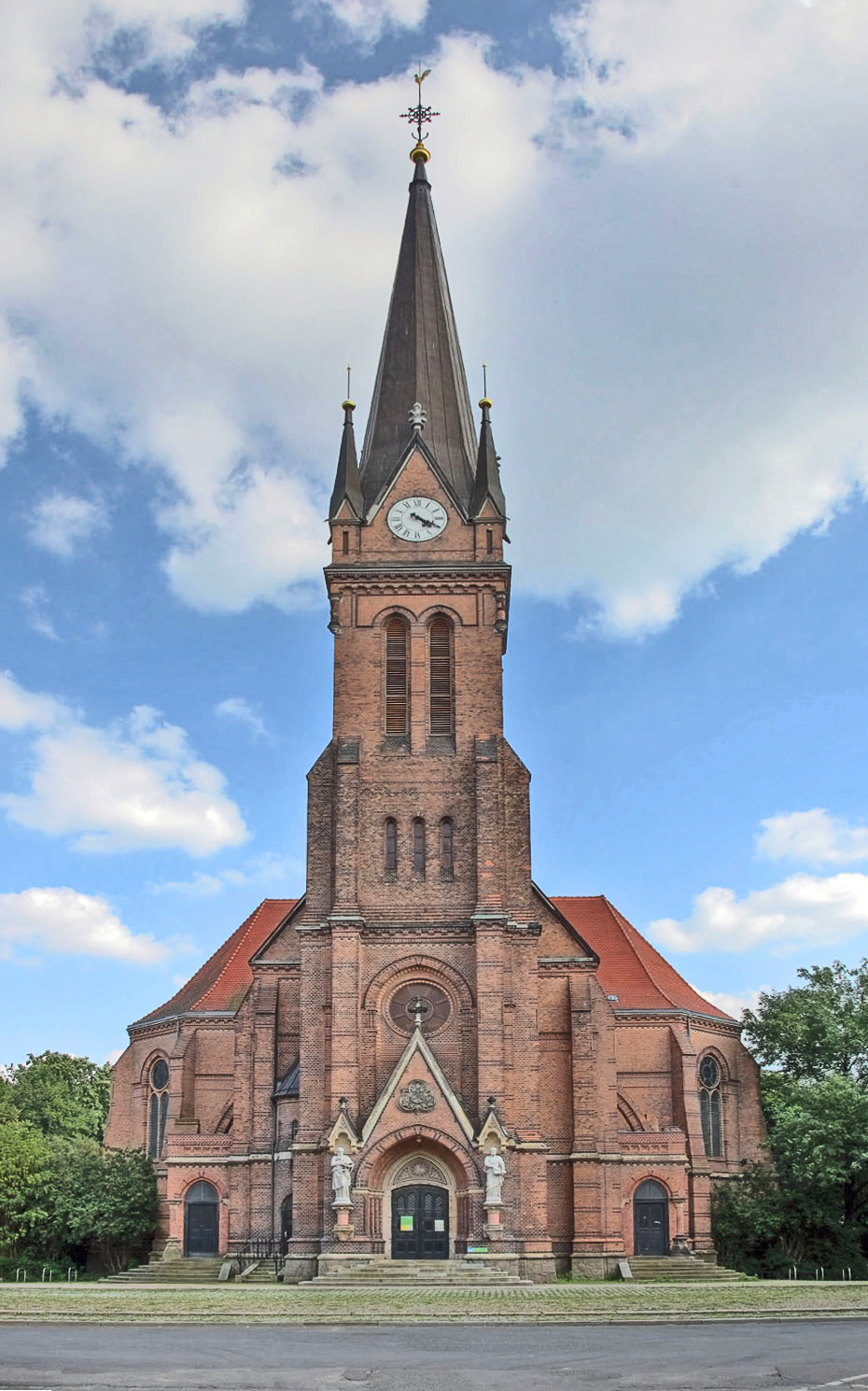
Luther church (Lutherkirche)

== Villa plots ==
Among others, the following wealthy personalities, first and foremost publishers, who had villas built in the Bachviertel in the 19th century, are worth mentioning; from the 1990s onwards, the villas were often renovated with consideration for cultural heritage management:

- Villa Baedeker for the travel book publisher Fritz Baedeker
- Villa ″Zur Julburg″ for the architect Oskar Mothes
- Villa Meyer for the publisher Herrmann Julius Meyer
- Villa Gebhardt for the publishing bookseller Leopold Gebhardt
- Villa Najork for the paper and cardboard manufacturer Gustav Najork, later boarding school of the Musisches Gymnasium

== Forum Thomanum ==
Individual buildings around the Thomasschule and Alumnat are part of the international music education center Forum Thomanum. Street names in the Bachviertel were chosen after the Thomaskantors Johann Sebastian Bach, Moritz Hauptmann and Johann Adam Hiller. As was common in the 19th century, the street network was given a grid system.

== Lost substance ==
The All Saints' Church was destroyed by the bombing of Leipzig in World War II.

== Flood in 1954 ==
During the flood in July 1954, the Bachviertel was under water. The defective Palmengarten weir (completed in 1917) caused water to enter the city of Leipzig.

== Access ==
Tram lines 1, 2 and 14 follow the Käthe-Kollwitz-Strasse over its entire length. The tram stop is Marschnerstrasse. The continuation of the Käthe-Kollwitz-Strasse over the Klinger bridge in the west is called Karl-Heine-Strasse. For pedestrians and cyclists coming from north, there is access to the Moschelesstrasse over the Saints Bridge.

== See also ==
- List of streets and squares in Leipzig
