= The Saxons' Bridge =

The Saxons' Bridge Sachsenbrücke
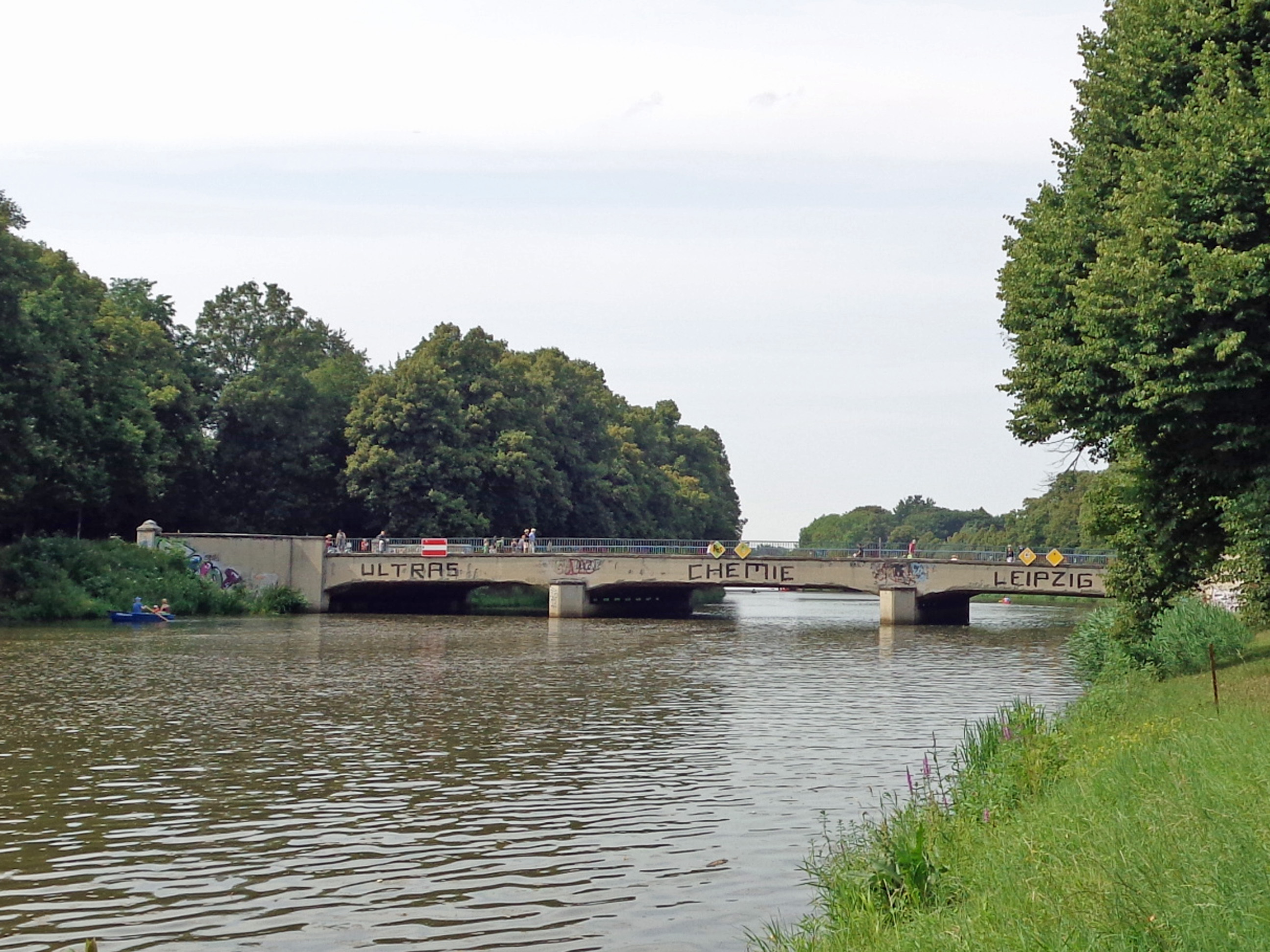
- View from south (2014)
- Coordinates: 51°19′49″N 12°21′15″E
- Carries: Anton-Bruckner-Allee
- Locale: Leipzig-Mitte and Schleußig
- Named for: The Saxon belligerents of the Battle of Leipzig
- Owner: City of Leipzig
- Heritage status: Denkmalliste Sachsen
- ID number: 09262690

Characteristics
- Material: Reinforced concrete bridge with shelly limestone cadding
- Width: 24 m (78.7 ft)
- Piers in water: 2

History
- Opened: 1897
- Rebuilt: 1928 / 29

Statistics
- Daily traffic: 15,000 bicycles per day, pedestrians

The Saxons' Bridge (German: Sachsenbrücke) over the Elsterflutbett (the flood channel of the Elster) connects the eastern and western parts of Clara Zetkin Park (formerly King Albert Park) in Leipzig, Germany. Located southwest of the city center, it also provides a car-free connection for pedestrians and cyclists from the center to the western part of Leipzig via Anton-Bruckner-Allee. According to the data from the 2021/22 traffic count, the Saxons' Bridge has the highest traffic occupancy with over 15,000 cyclists per day in cycling in Leipzig.

== History ==
The bridge is named after the Saxon troops switching sides from Napoleon Bonaparte to the allies during the Battle of Leipzig in 1813. However, this name only became official on 7 November 1901.

The first bridge on the same site was built in 1897 for the Sächsisch-Thüringische Industrie- und Gewerbeausstellung (Litt.: Saxon-Thuringian industrial and commercial exhibition). The bridge in its current version was built in 1928 after the Elster Flood Channel was widened.

Today the heritage monument is a popular meeting place, especially for young Leipzig residents, and attracts musicians and artists, especially in summer. During the period of the expiring Corona lockdown in June 2021, the bridge made media headlines as a party and crime hotspot after over 1,000 people gathered here several times over the weekend to celebrate.

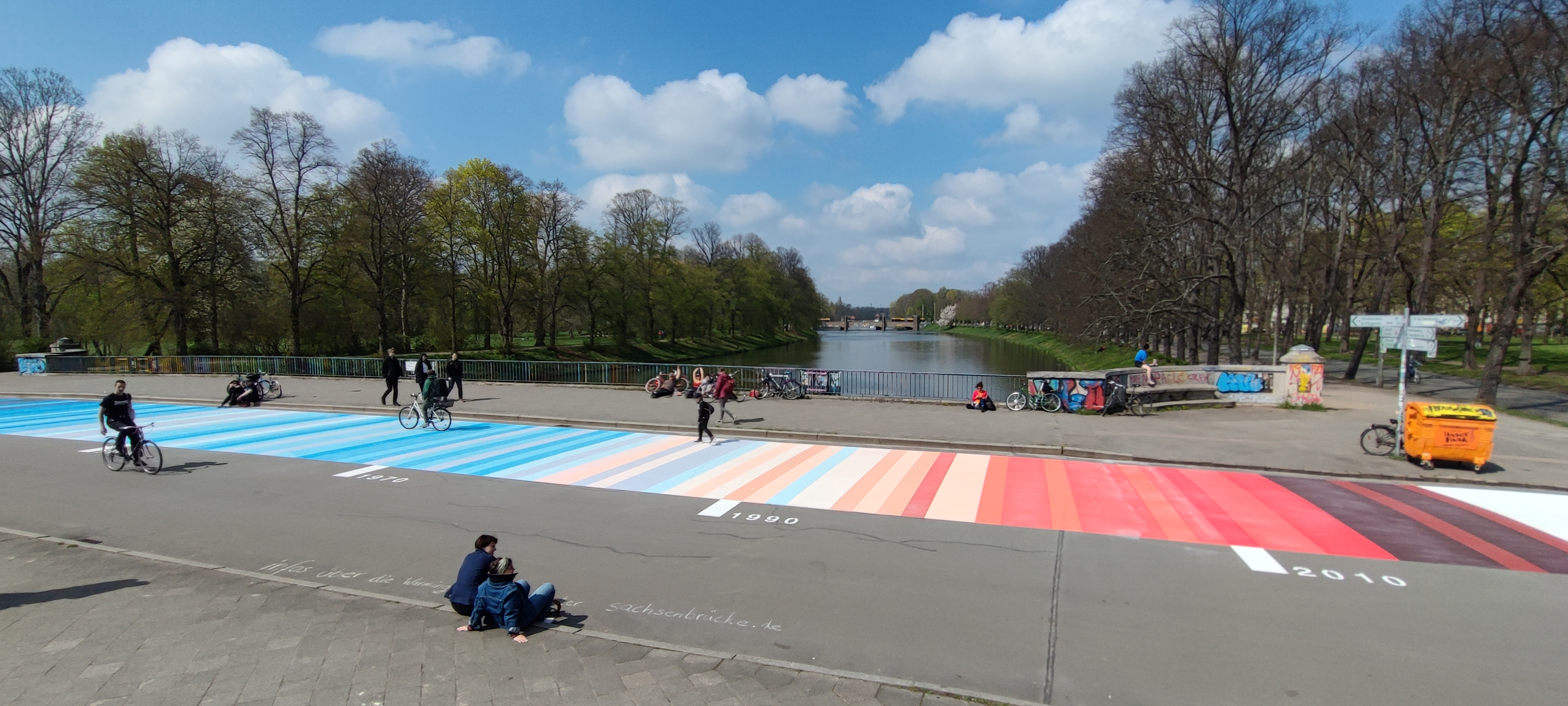
Warming Stripes on the Saxons' Bridge (2022)

In April 2022, the climate alliance “Leipzig for the Climate” applied the warming stripes as a painting to the road surface on the bridge.

== Literature ==
- Bettina Weil: Leipziger Brücken II – Brücken über Weiße Elster, Elsterflutbett, Elsterbecken, Elstermühlgraben, Hundewasser und Knauthainer Elstermühlgraben [10/08]: Stadt Leipzig, Amt für Statistik und Wahlen, Leipzig 2008, p. 48 (in German)
