= Johannapark =

Public park in Leipzig

Coordinates: 51°20′4.3908″N 12°21′45.058″E

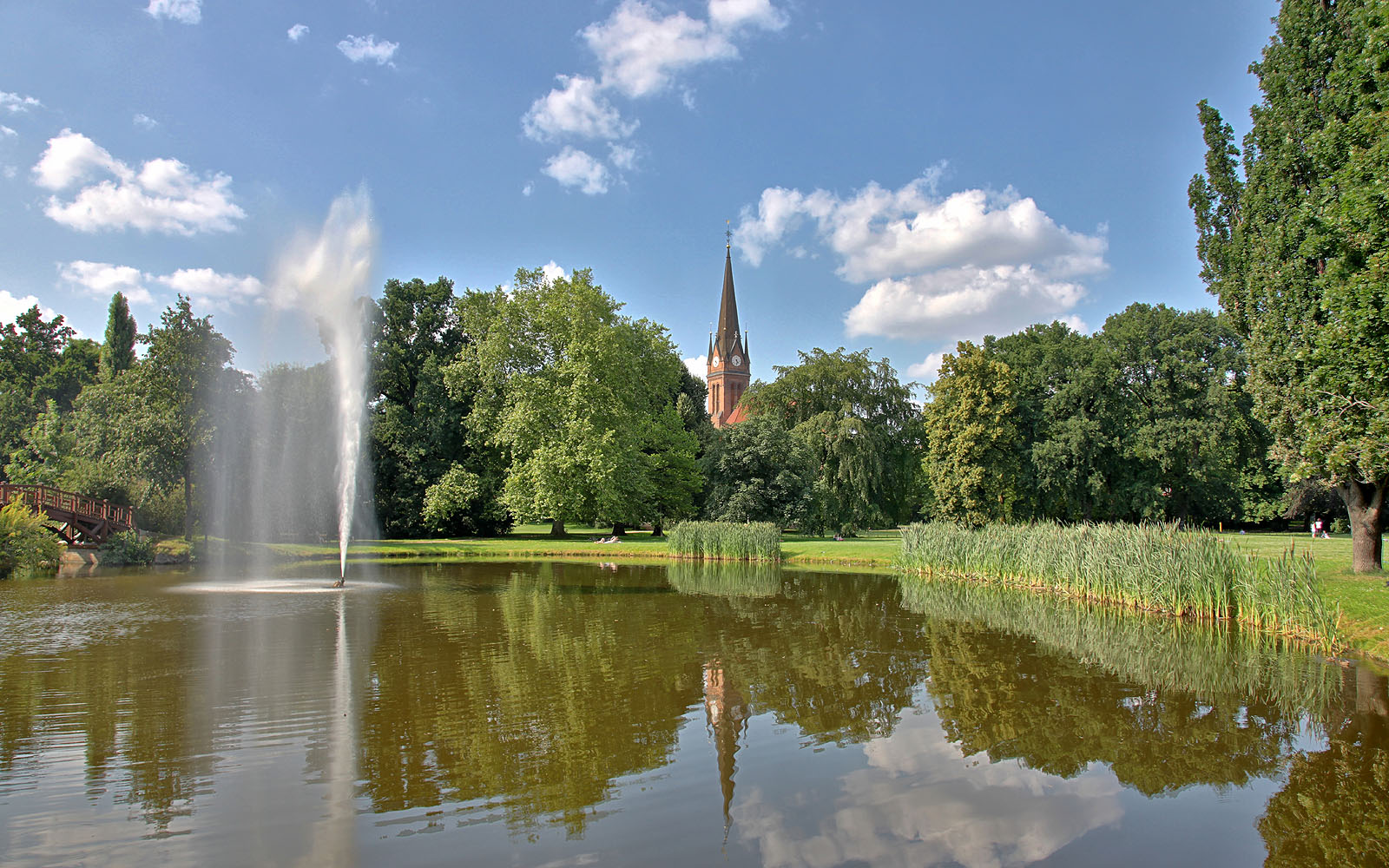
- Johannapark in July 2009
- Interactive map of Johannapark
- Type: Urban park
- Location: Leipzig, Saxony, Germany
- Area: 11 ha (27 acres)
- Created: 1863
- Open: all year round

The Johannapark is an 11 hectares (27 acres) park near the city center in Leipzig. In the southwest it merges seamlessly into the Clara Zetkin Park and together with it and the Palmengarten forms a large park landscape that continues in the north and south in the Leipzig Auenwald.

== Location ==
The park is located in the Westvorstadt area of Leipzig, in the borough of Leipzig-Mitte. It is framed to the north-west by Ferdinand-Lassalle-Strasse, to the north-east by Paul-Gerhardt-Weg and Friedrich-Ebert-Strasse, to the south by Karl-Tauchnitz-Strasse and to the south-west by Edvard-Grieg-Allee. Adjacent residential areas are the Bachviertel, the inner Westvorstadt and the Musikviertel.

== History ==
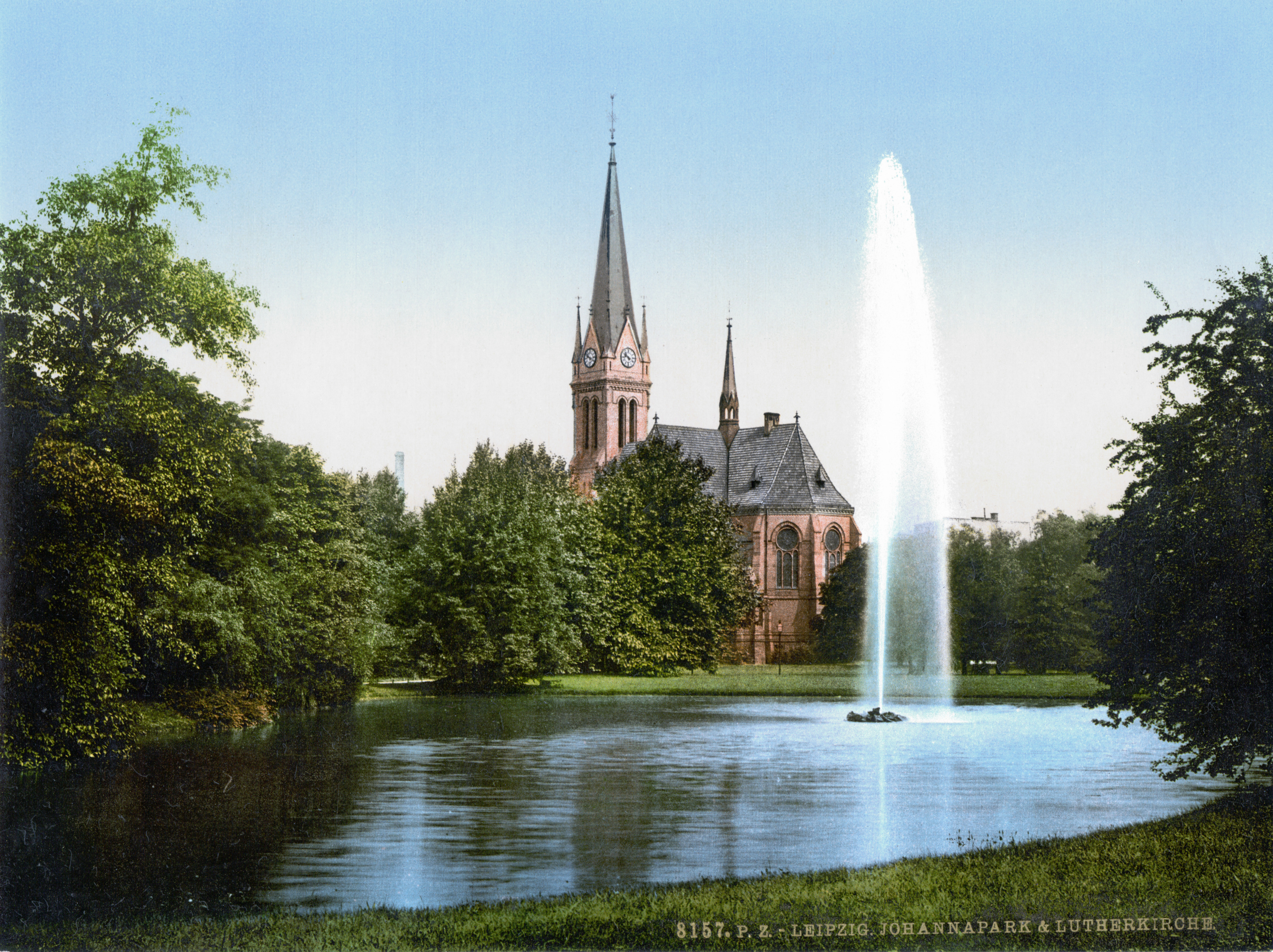
Johannapark with pond and Lutherkirche, coloured photograph around 1900

The Johannapark was created between 1858 and 1863 by the Leipzig entrepreneur and banker Wilhelm Theodor Seyfferth (1807-1881) at his own expense and later donated to the city. He wanted to commemorate his daughter Johanna Natalie Schulz, who died at the age of 21. According to tradition, she was broken when, according to her father's wishes, she had to marry the unloved Dr. Gustav Schulz. Full of remorse, her father thought of leaving something to posterity that would have been in her interest:

"The idea of establishing a foundation from a capital that had been earmarked for my deceased daughter, which would not only perpetuate her name, but also the prevailing direction of her character 'to make others happy', prompted me to accept to buy the meadow of the wife of Professor Schwägrichen at the Kuhstrang. It is my intention to turn it into a park and to call it Johannapark."

— Wilhelm Theodor Seyfferth, from the letter to the Leipzig Council in 1863

Seyfferth acquired the Martorff meadow on the banks of the Pleiße and some adjoining areas and let them convert into a park in the style of English landscape gardens according to plans by Peter Joseph Lenné (1789–1866). The park was laid out by the Leipzig council gardener Otto Wittenberg (1834–1918). As is usual with Lenné, many exotic tree species were planted, giving the park the character of a botanical garden in places. A pond with a small island and two bridges was created in the center of the park.

With Seyfferth's death in 1881, the park passed to the city of Leipzig in his will and testament, with the condition that the area should never be built over. It was again enlarged to a floor area of eight hectares (20 acres). With the construction of the Lutherkirche between 1884 and 1887, an architectural accent was set in the neo-Gothic style. The park came to its present dimensions by merging it with the gardens and grounds of some of the buildings destroyed in World War II.

In 1955, the Johannapark was combined with the neighboring Albertpark, the Scheibenholzpark and the Palmengarten under the name "Clara Zetkin" Central Culture Park. Since April 2011, the park has returned to its old name, Johannapark.

== Monuments ==
In 1896 the city erected the Seyfferth monument in the park for the donor. Inscription on the base: "To the donor of the Johannapark the grateful city". The pedestal is by Hugo Licht (1841-1923), the marble bust by Melchior zur Strassen (1832-1896). A wall tomb of the Seyfferth family is located outside the choir of the Lutherkirche. The 1897 Leipzig memorial to Chancellor Bismarck by Adolf Lehnert (1862-1948) and Josef Mágr (1861-1924) was destroyed in 1946. In 1967, the Clara Zetkin memorial by the sculptor Walter Arnold (1909-1979) was erected on the same site to mark her 110th birthday. In 1996, the Leipzig entrepreneur Walter Cramer (1886-1944), who was involved in the failed assassination attempt on Adolf Hitler (1889-1945) on 20 July 1944, was honored here with a memorial by the city of Leipzig. The stele made of black granite and green Saxon serpentinite is the work of the sculptor Klaus Friedrich Messerschmidt (* 1945).

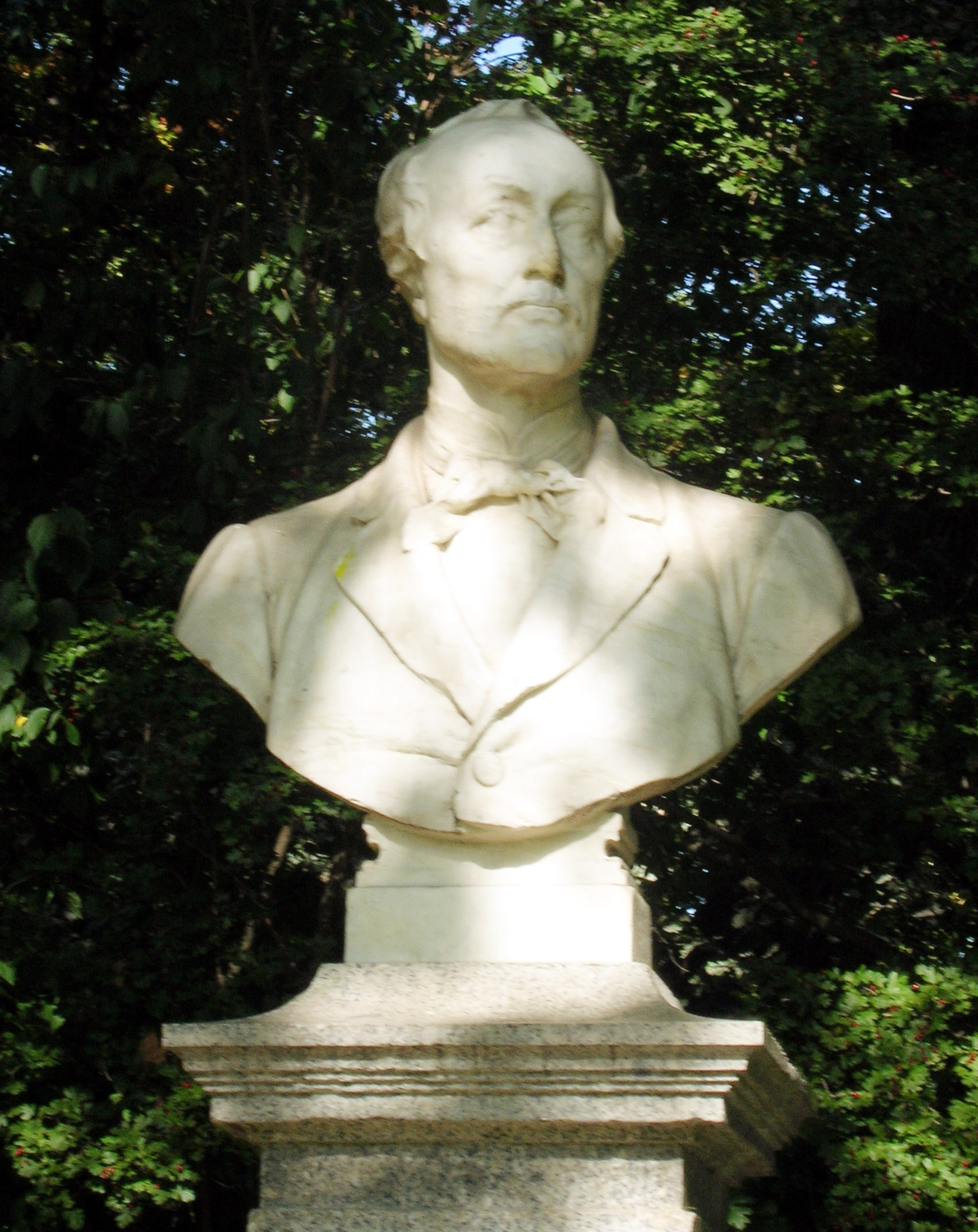
Memorial to Wilhelm Seyfferth (bust), 2010

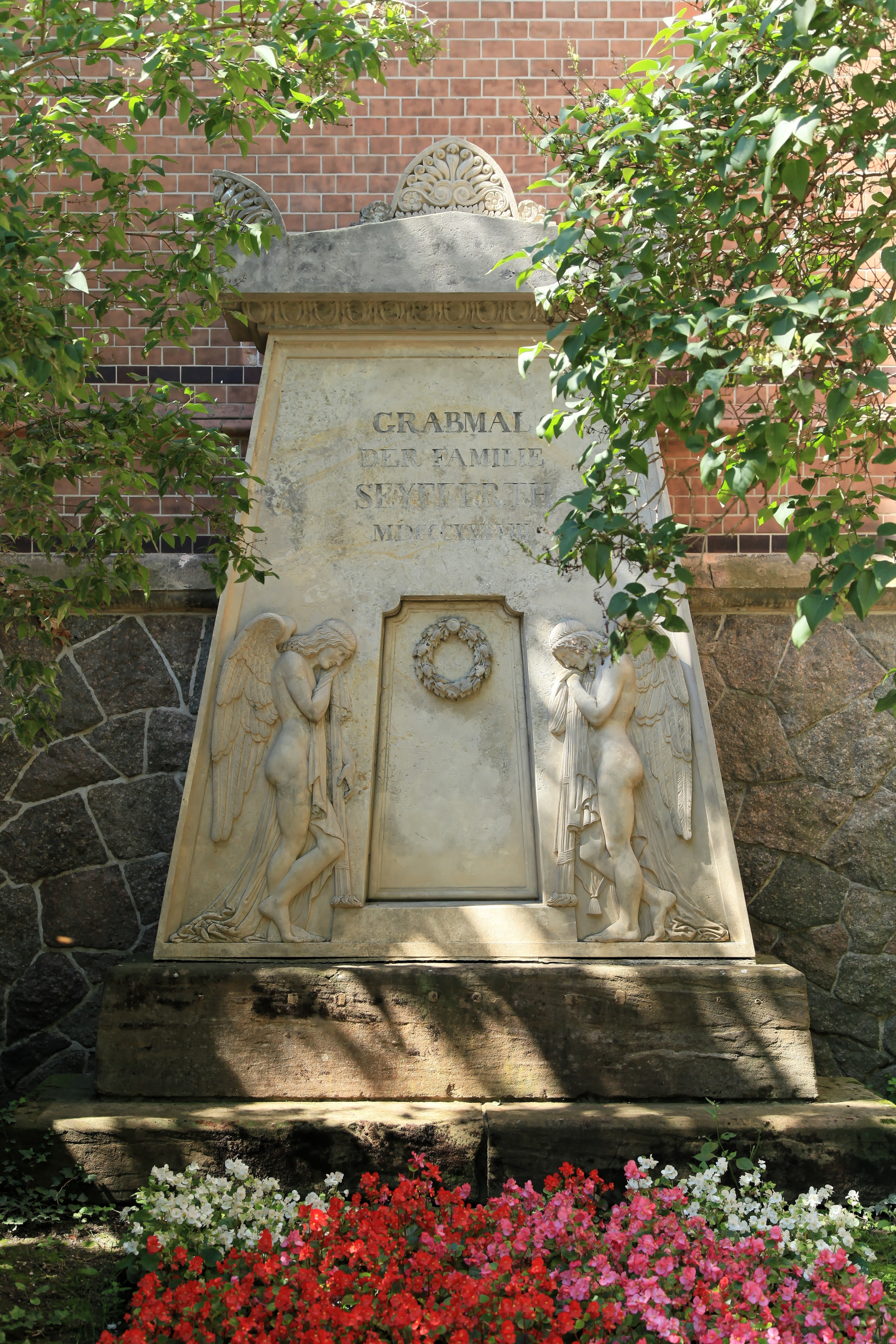
Tomb of the family Seyfferth at the Lutherkirche, 2016

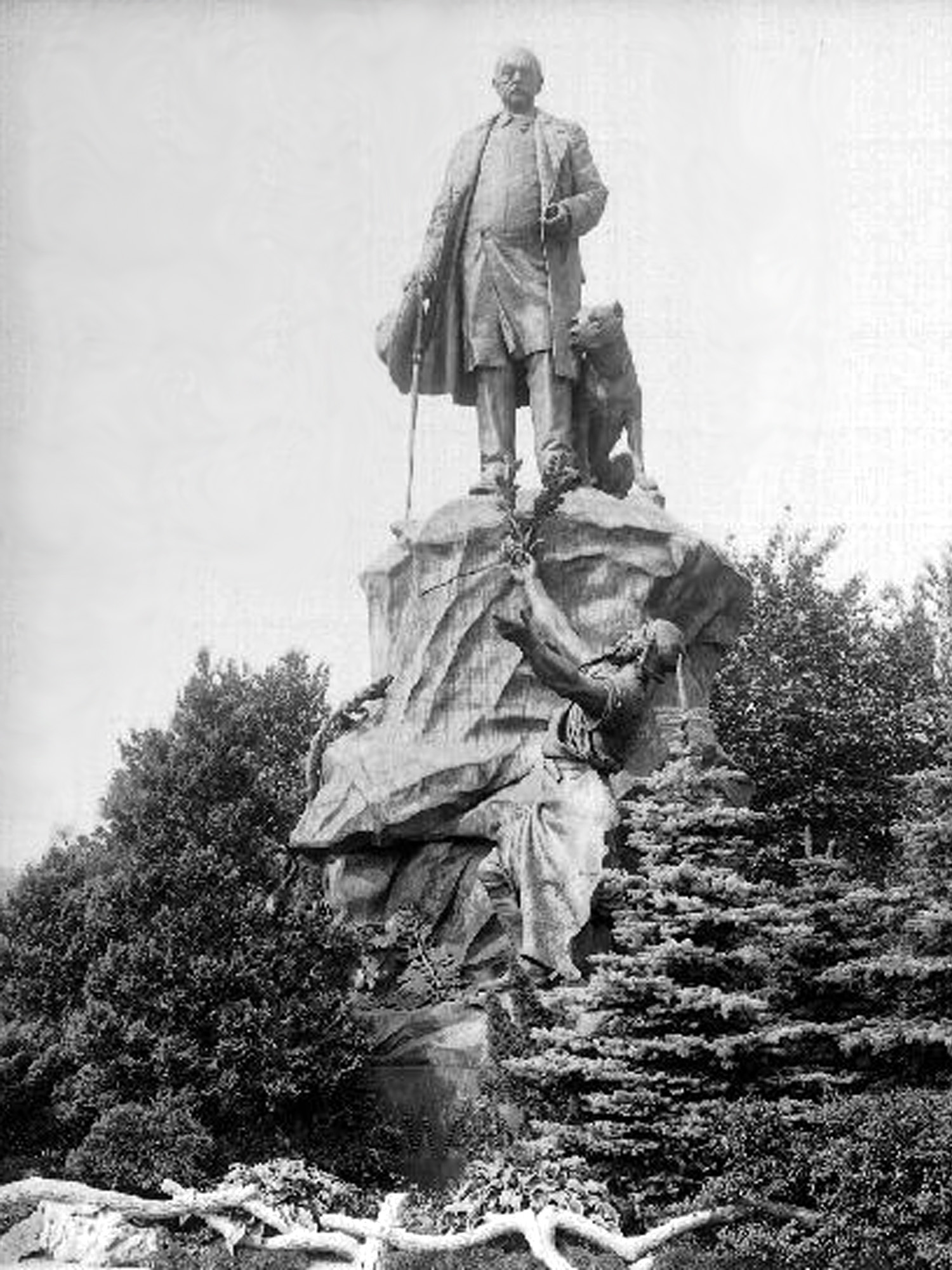
Previous memorial to Bismarck from 1897

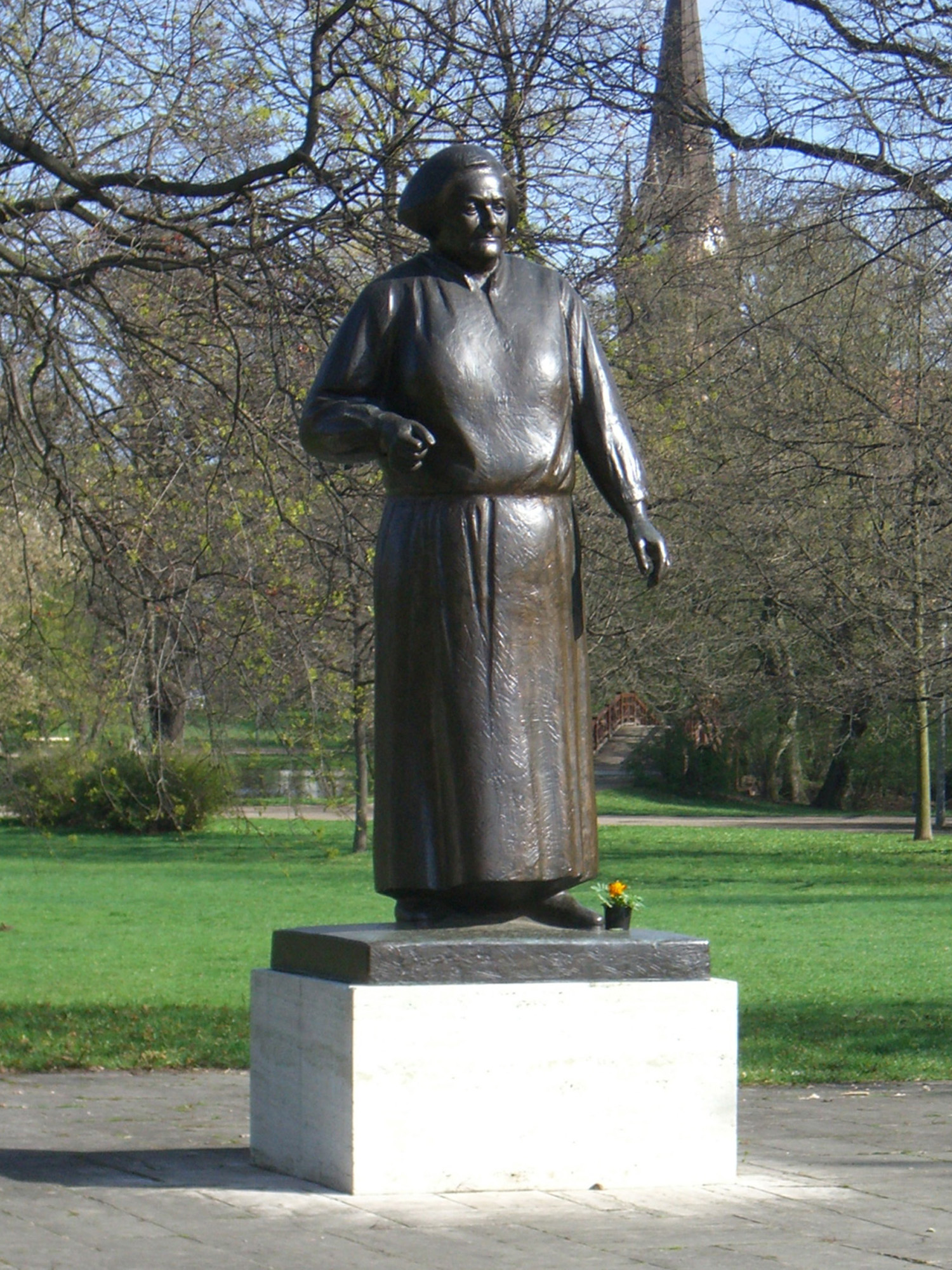
Memorial to Clara Zetkin, 2010

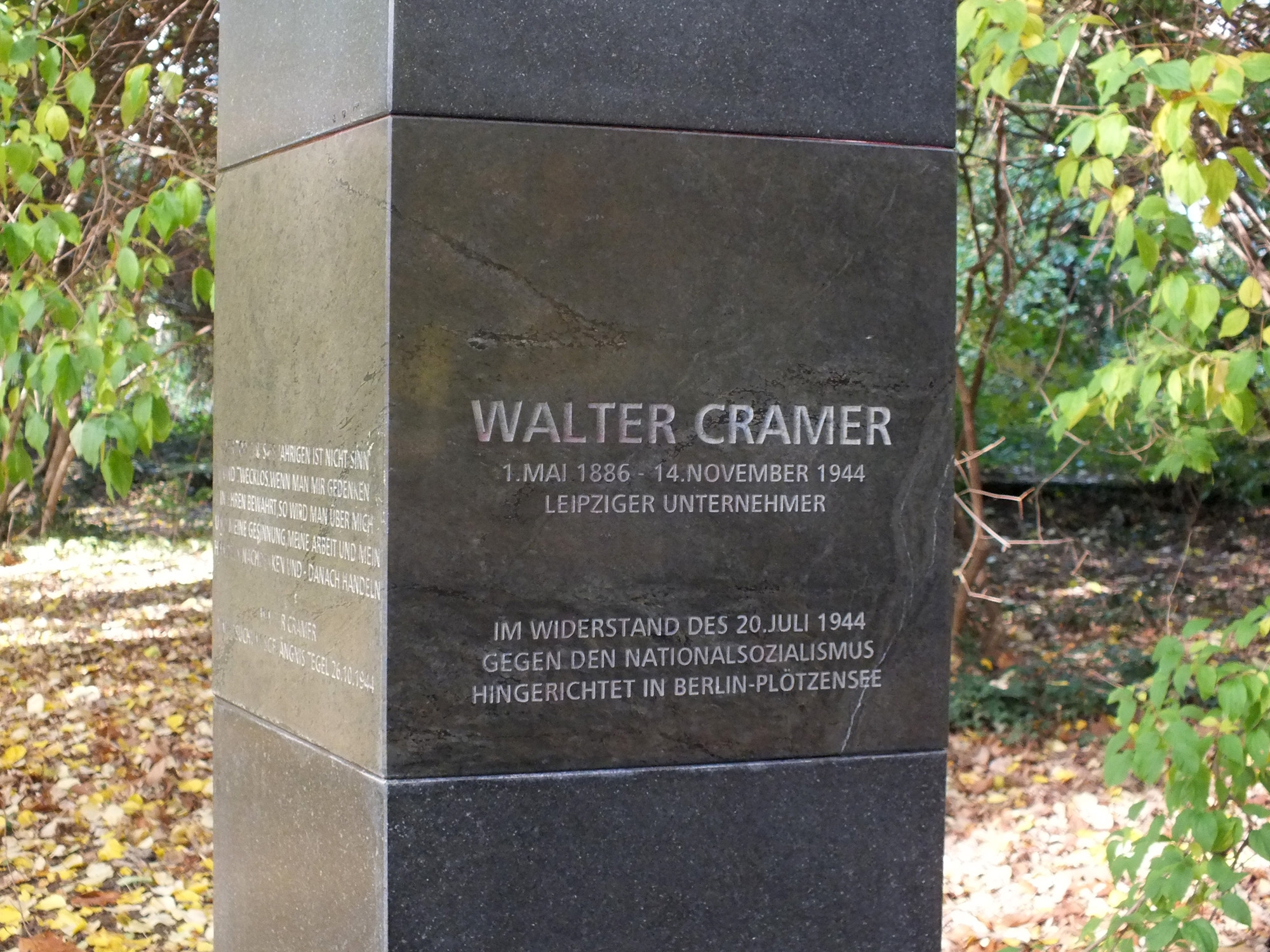
Center piece of the memorial to Walter Cramer, 2011

== See also ==
Opposite the park, there is the art museum Galerie für Zeitgenössische Kunst.

== Literature ==
- Hans-Christian Mannschatz: Park und Rennbahn. In: Das Leipziger Musikviertel. Verlag im Wissenschaftszentrum Leipzig, 1997, ISBN 3-930433-18-4, S. 135 ff. (in German)
- Riedel, Horst (2005). Stadtlexikon Leipzig von A bis Z (in German). Leipzig: Pro Leipzig. pp. 271–272. ISBN 3-936508-03-8.
- Petra Friedrich, Johannapark Leipzig, in: Staatliche Schlösser, Burgen und Gärten Sachsens (ed.), Sachsen Grün. Historische Gärten und Parks, L & H Verlag Hamburg / Berlin 2006, ISBN 3-938608-02-1, pp. 169–172, in German
- Johannapark, in: Peter Benecken, Parks & Gärten im Grünen Ring Leipzig, ed. by Pro Leipzig, Stadt Leipzig, Grüner Ring and culturtraeger Leipzig, Leipzig 2014, ISBN 978-3-945027-10-3, p. 16f. (in German)
- Ringel, Sebastian (2015). Leipzig! One Thousand Years of History. Leipzig: Author and Edition Leipzig in the Seemann Henschel GmbH & Co. KG. pp. 92–93. ISBN 978-3-361-00710-9.
