= List of arcade galleries in Leipzig =

The arcade galleries in Leipzig developed in connection with the emergence of inner-city exhibition centers of the Leipziger Messe at the turn of the 20th century and are often based on old passageways. But the tradition of building passages has also been maintained in more recent times. The Leipzig passages and courtyards thus form a unique architectural quality in Leipzig-Mitte and run through the old city center parallel to the network of existing streets and alleys like a second, private path system that is only reserved for pedestrians.

The list includes all the usable arcade galleries.

Picture	Name	Address and access	Length and area	Built or remodeled
More pictures	Barthels Hof	Hainstrasse 1 (51.341158°N 12.373400°E); Markt 8, Barfußgäßchen, Webers Hof	122 m (400.3 ft); 876 m^{2} (9,429.2 sq ft) including Webers Hof	1747–1750; 1870/1871 portal to the Markt; 1997 fundamental renovation
More pictures	Bauwens-Haus	Burgplatz 2 (51.337452°N 12.372867°E); Ratsfreischulstraße, Markgrafenstraße	46 m (150.9 ft); 589 m^{2} (6,339.9 sq ft)	1991–1994 new building
More pictures	Blauer Hecht	Nikolaistraße 39–45 (51.342145°N 12.377746°E); Nikolaistraße, Reichsstraße	37 m (121.4 ft); 146 m^{2} (1,571.5 sq ft)	1911/1912
More pictures	Brühl-Arkade	Brühl 33 / Richard-Wagner-Straße 9 (51.343055°N 12.377386°E); Brühl, Richard-Wagner-Straße	86 m (282.2 ft); 477 m^{2} (5,134.4 sq ft)	1998 new building
More pictures	Burgplatz-Passage	Burgplatz 5, Markgrafenstraße, Burgstraße (51.337129°N 12.373582°E)	28 m (91.9 ft) extension of the Petersbogen	2017–2020 new building
More pictures	Dresdner Hof	Neumarkt 21–27 (51.337825°N 12.376971°E); Kupfergasse, Neumarkt, Magazingasse	80 m (262.5 ft); 624 m^{2} (6,716.7 sq ft)	1912/1913 exhibition center 1998–2000 renovation
More pictures	Der Große Joachimsthal	Hainstraße 10, Katharinenstraße 13 (51.342004°N 12.374048°E); Hainstraße, Katharinenstraße	49 m (160.8 ft); 215 m^{2} (2,314.2 sq ft)	1896–1906; 2000 Hainstraße side renovated
More pictures	Hansa-Haus	Grimmaische Straße 13–15 (51.340072°N 12.377469°E); Grimmaische Strasse, Passage Specks Hof	136 m (446.2 ft); 709 m^{2} (7,631.6 sq ft) including passage Specks Hof	1904–1906; 1993–1997 new building
More pictures	Handwerkerpassage	Markt 10, Klostergasse 16 (51.340656°N 12.373622°E); Markt, Klostergasse, Barfußgäßchen	76 m (249.3 ft); 309 m^{2} (3,326.0 sq ft)	1845–1846; GDR 1987–1989, front building renovated 1997–1998
More pictures	Jägerhof-Passage	Hainstraße 17–19, Große Fleischergasse 11–13 (51.342105°N 12.372761°E); Hainstraße, Große Fleischergasse	123 m (403.5 ft); 1,055 m^{2} (11,355.9 sq ft)	1911–1914 Hainstraße; 1919/1920 Gr. Fleischergasse; 1998 renovated
More pictures	King Albert House	Markt 9, Barfußgäßchen 2–8 (51.341009°N 12.373832°E); Markt, Barfußgäßchen	71 m (232.9 ft); 244 m^{2} (2,626.4 sq ft)	1913 renovated
More pictures	Königshaus-Passage	Markt 17, Petersstrasse 13 (51.339436°N 12.375111°E); Markt, Petersstraße, Mädlerpassage, Messehofpassage	121 m (397.0 ft); 743 m^{2} (7,997.6 sq ft)	1932 arcade passage 1961–1963 access to Messehofpassage; 2004–2006 renovation
More pictures	Kretschmanns Hof	Hainstraße 14, Katharinenstraße 17 (51.342393°N 12.374411°E); Hainstraße, Katharinenstraße	89 m (292.0 ft); 479 m^{2} (5,155.9 sq ft)	1912–1914; 2009–2010 renovation
More pictures	Mädler Arcade Gallery (Mädlerpassage)	Grimmaische Straße 2–4, Neumarkt 14 (51.339081°N 12.375450°E); Grimmaische Straße, Neumarkt, Königshaus-Passage	140 m (459.3 ft); 840 m^{2} (9,041.7 sq ft)	1912–1914; 1995–1997 renovation
More pictures	Marktgalerie	Markt 11, 12, Klostergasse 12 (51.340324°N 12.373606°E); Markt, Klostergasse	80 m (262.5 ft); 624 m^{2} (6,716.7 sq ft)	2002–2005 renovation
More pictures	Messehofpassage	Petersstraße 15, Neumarkt 16–18 (51.338819°N 12.375525°E); Petersstraße, Neumarkt, Preußergäßchen, Königshaus-Passage	140 m (459.3 ft); 870 m^{2} (9,364.6 sq ft)	1949/1950; 2004–2006 renovation
More pictures	Oelßners Hof	Nikolaistraße 20–26, Ritterstraße 23–29 (51.341785°N 12.378822°E); Nikolaistraße, Ritterstraße		1907/1908; 2012–2015 renovation
More pictures	Petersbogen	Petersstraße 36–44, Burgstraße 27 (51.337577°N 12.374152°E); Petersstraße, Burgstraße, Schloßgasse	116 m (380.6 ft); 1,557 m^{2} (16,759.4 sq ft)	1999–2001 new building
More pictures	Specks Hof	Reichsstraße 4, Schuhmachergäßchen 2, Nikolaistraße 3–9 (51.340313°N 12.3774570°E); Reichsstraße, Schuhmachergäßchen, Nikolaistraße, Hansa-Haus	136 m (446.2 ft); 709 m^{2} (7,631.6 sq ft) including Hansa-Haus	1908/1909, 1911, 1928/1929 construction in stages 1993–1997 renovation
More pictures	Städtisches Kaufhaus	Neumarkt 9–19, Universitätsstraße 16 (51.338492°N 12.376978°E); Neumarkt, Universitätsstraße, Gewandgäßchen, Kupfergasse	144 m (472.4 ft); 690 m^{2} (7,427.1 sq ft)	1893–1901; 1993–1994 renovation
More pictures	Steibs Hof/ Dussmann-Passage	Nikolaistraße 28–32, Brühl 64–66 (51.342038°N 12.378504°E); Nikolaistraße, Brühl	83 m (272.3 ft); 412 m^{2} (4,434.7 sq ft)	1906/1907; 1994–1996 renovation
More pictures	Stentzlers Hof	Petersstraße 39–41 (51.342038°N 12.378504°E); Petersstraße, Peterskirchhof.		1914–1916; 1994/1995 renovation
More pictures	Strohsack-Passage	Nikolaistraße 10 / Ritterstraße 7 (51.340904°N 12.378522°E); Nikolaistraße, Ritterstraße	88 m (288.7 ft); 6,050 m^{2} (65,121.7 sq ft)	1995–1997 new building
More pictures	Theaterpassage	Goethestraße 2, Ritterstraße 6 (51.339958°N 12.379781°E); Goethestraße, Ritterstraße	43 m (141.1 ft); 165 m^{2} (1,776.0 sq ft)	1927/1928
More pictures	Webers Hof	Hainstraße 3 (51.341317°N 12.373783°E); Hainstraße, Barthels Hof	122 m (400.3 ft); 876 m^{2} (9,429.2 sq ft) including Barthels Hof	1662; 1845–47, 1872 remodeled 1995–1997 renovation, restoration to the structural condition of 1662

== See also ==
- Architecture of Leipzig
- Bowling Club

== Literature ==
- Hocquél, Wolfgang (2011). Die Leipziger Passagen und Höfe. Architektur von europäischem Rang [The Leipzig passages and courtyards. Architecture of European standing] (in German). Markkleeberg: Sax-Verlag. ISBN 978-3-86729-087-6.
- Geist, Johann Friedrich (1982). Passagen. Ein Bautyp des 19. Jahrhunderts (in German) (4 ed.). Munich: Prestel-Verlag. ISBN 3-7913-0487-9.
