= Hainstrasse =

Street in Leipzig, Germany

Coordinates: 51.341941°N 12.373653°E

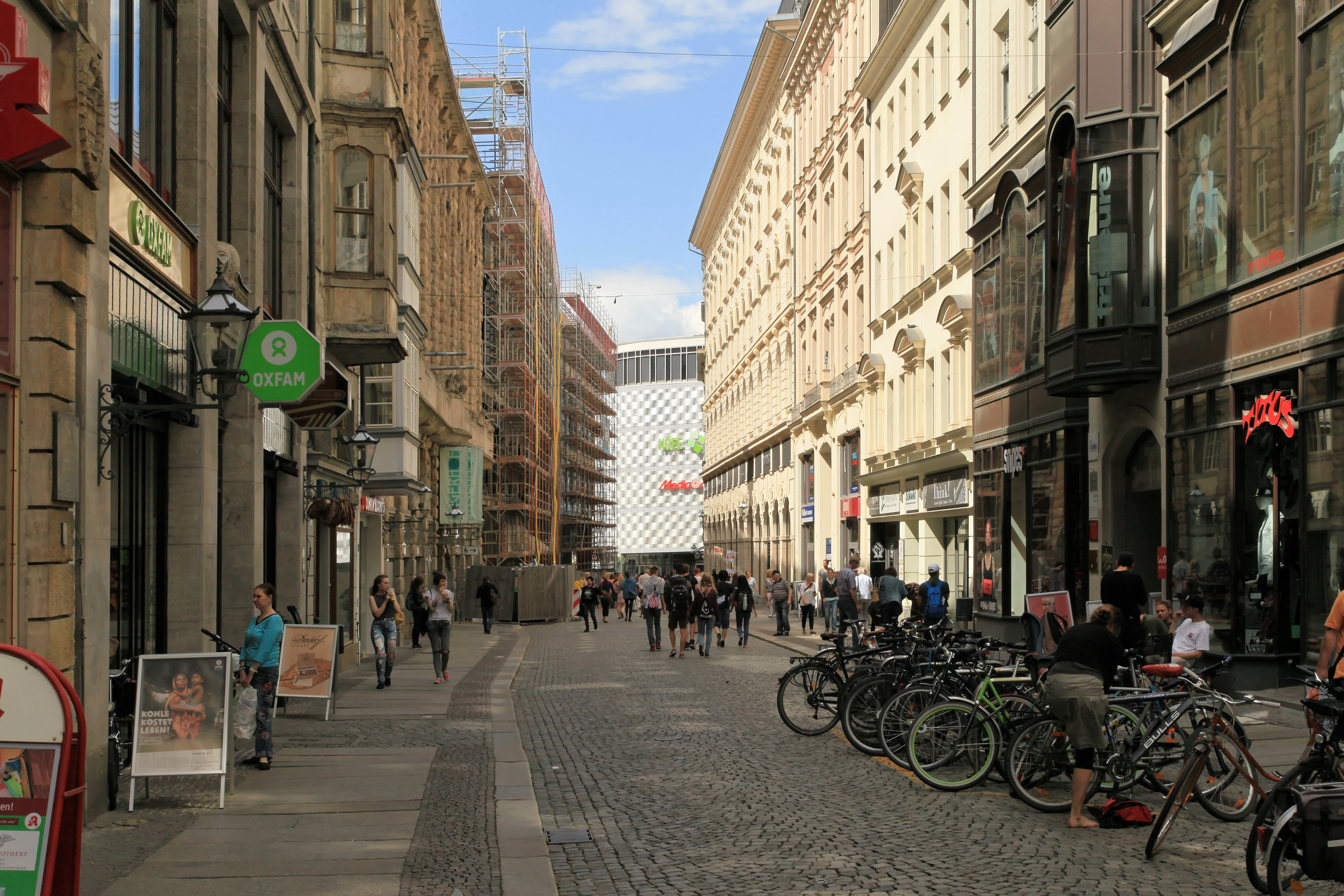
- Northern part of Hainstrasse (2015)
- Interactive map of Hainstrasse
- Former names: Ranstädter Strasse, Hagenstrasse, Heunstrasse, Hoynstrasse
- Length: 239 m (784 ft)
- Width: 10 m (32.8 ft)
- Location: Leipzig-Mitte, Leipzig, Germany
- Postal code: 04109
- Nearest metro station: Leipzig Markt station of S-Bahn Mitteldeutschland in the south and the tram interchange station Goerdelerring in the north
- North end: Richard-Wagner-Platz and Brühl
- South end: Markt

Hainstrasse is a street in the northwest of the central quarter inside the Inner City Ring Road of Leipzig, Germany. It begins in the northwest corner of the Markt and leads almost in a straight line with a slight swing to the left in a north-northwest direction without any intersections to Brühl and Richard-Wagner-Platz.

== History ==
Hainstrasse is one of the oldest streets in the city. As early as the Middle Ages, the long-distance trade route Via Imperii ran through it, crossing with the Via Regia at the northern end. When the Via Imperii was moved to Reichsstrasse after 1100, today's Hainstrasse became the main street of the northwestern Rannisches Viertel (Rannian quarter) in the city. The street was first mentioned by name in 1390 as Ranstädter Strasse, as one reached Ranstädt (today Markranstädt) via the Ranstädt Gate (Ranstädter Tor) near its end via the Via Regia. From the 15th century onwards, the current name finally prevailed for Hagenstrasse, Heunstrasse and Hoynstrasse. Hain is the German word for grove which refers to the Rosental grove northwest of the old town.

The current shape of the street is mainly characterized by houses from the 16th to 19th centuries, which is a rarity for Leipzig streets in this compact form. Since the properties were narrow and carts could not turn around in the yard, the trading yards often extended to the next street. Passages or passageways later emerged from this. With six, Hainstrasse has the most properties of this type in Leipzig. In the 20th century, Hainstrasse developed into one of the city's most important shopping streets with shops in almost every house.

By the bombing of Leipzig in World War II, the buildings at the northwest end were completely destroyed and others were badly damaged. Around 1960, a large low-rise building with a textile and stationery store was opened on the site of total destruction. Despite the deteriorating buildings, Hainstrasse remained a popular shopping location during the GDR era.

After the Fall of the Berlin Wall, numerous shops had to close for various reasons. A revival only occurred again after the extensive renovation of the street between 1996 and 1999, during which many historic buildings were restored to their former glory, in some cases with a new building behind the historic facade. In 2016, the Hainspitze commercial building was opened on the site of the low-rise building and open space.

Today, Hainstrasse is a frequented pedestrian zone in a prime location.

== Development ==
The development of Hainstrasse begins on the western side with Barthels Hof (No. 1), a typical trade court building with a passage to Kleine Fleischergasse No. 2. The following Webers Hof (No. 3) in turn has a passage connection to Barthels Hof. The Kleines Joachimsthal passage begins in house no. 5/7, which leads through several atriums to Kleine Fleischergasse 8 and was impassable from the time of the Second World War until its reconstruction in 2012. In 1841/1842 Theodor Fontane (1819–1898) continued his pharmacist training in the Adler Pharmacy (No. 9), which has existed in the same location for over 300 years. The right-hand building next to the pharmacy, Zum Grauen Wolf (Gray Wolf) (No. 11, built in 1909/10), takes its name from an inn that has existed since the 16th century. The Jägerhof (No. 17/19) is in turn a passage to Große Fleischergasse 11/13. The UT Hainstrasse cinema has been located in the back since 1915. Today the Passage cinemas operate five arthouse cinemas here which are also a location of the annual documentary film festival Dok Leipzig. The Hainspitze (No. 27–29), which extends to the Brühl, stands on the property of the war-destroyed houses Goldener Elefant (Golden elephant) and Bärmanns Hof, both of which extend to the large Fleischergasse, as well as the Große Tuchhalle (Great Cloth Hall) from 1837.

Buildings on Hainstrasse

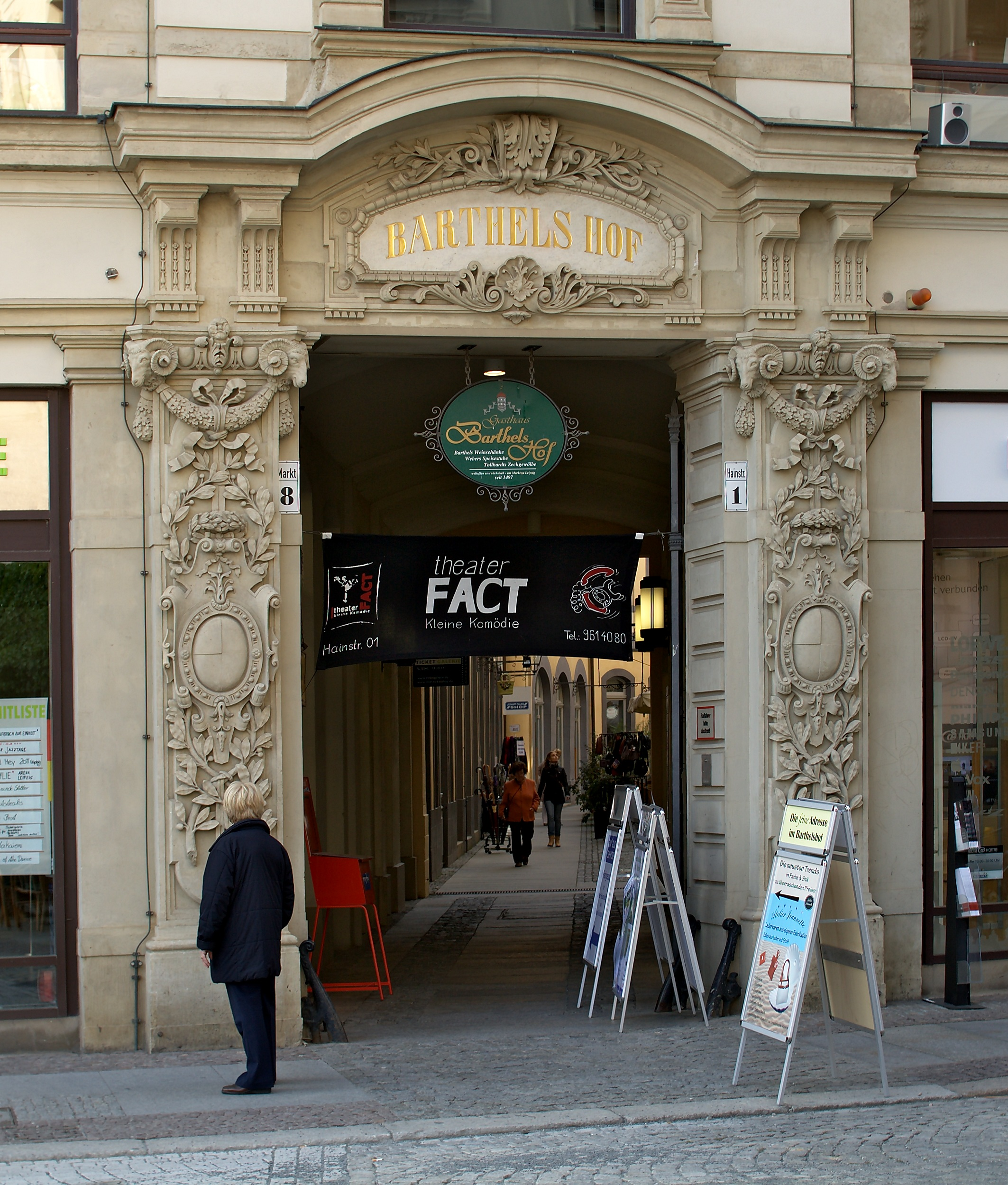
Entrance to Barthels Hof (2010)

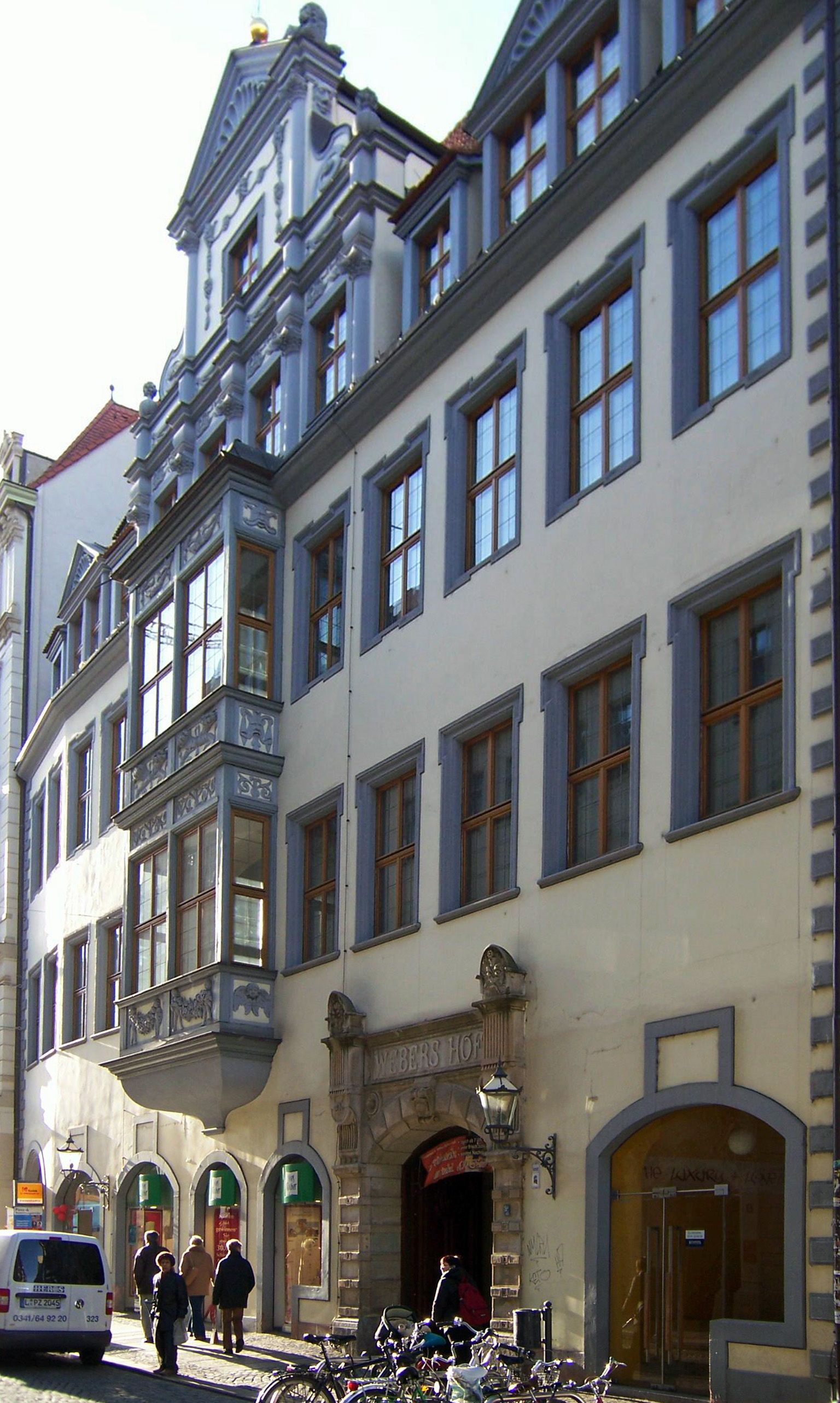
Webers Hof (2007)

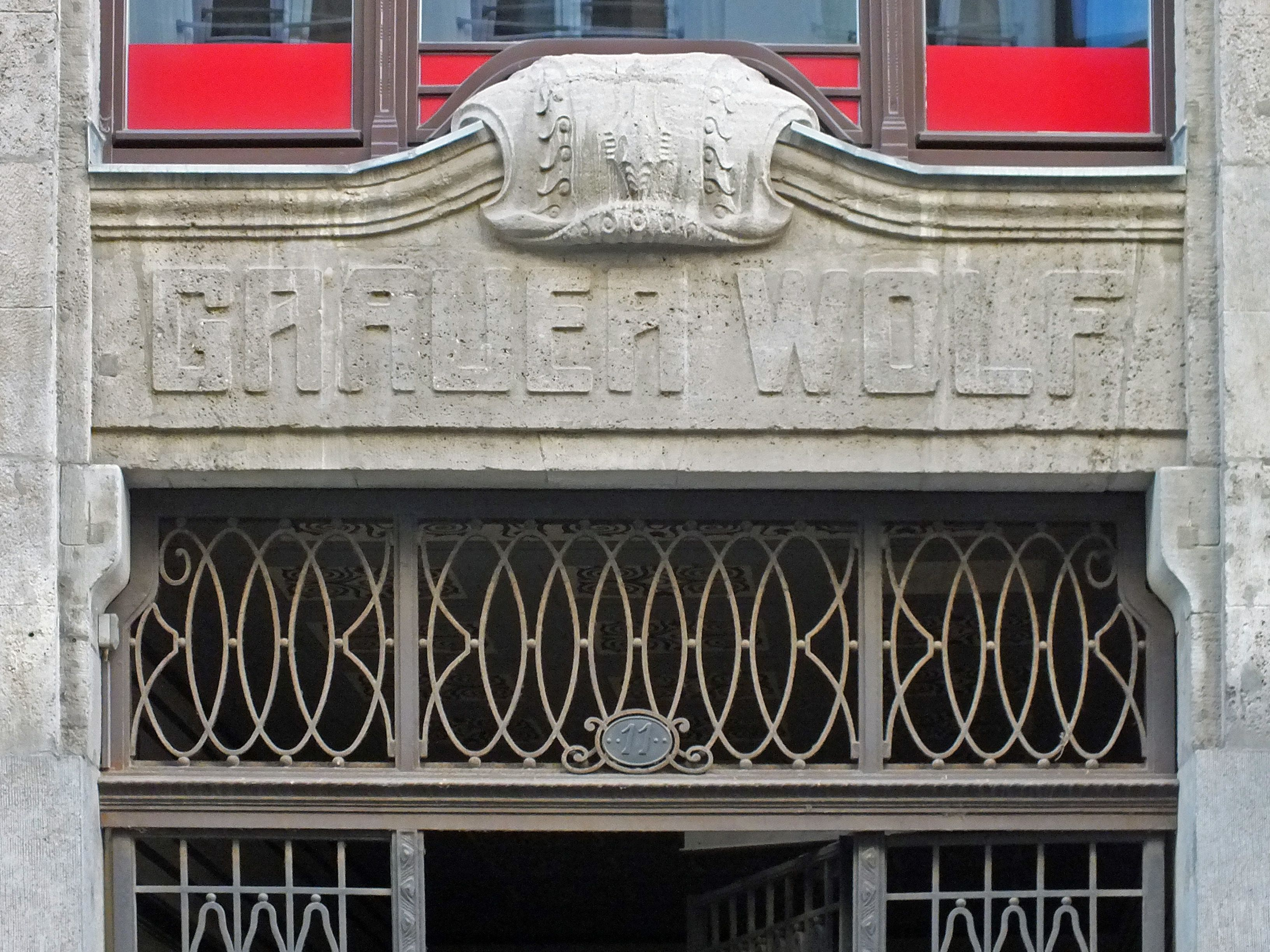
Entrance Grauer Wolf (Gray Wolf) (2017)

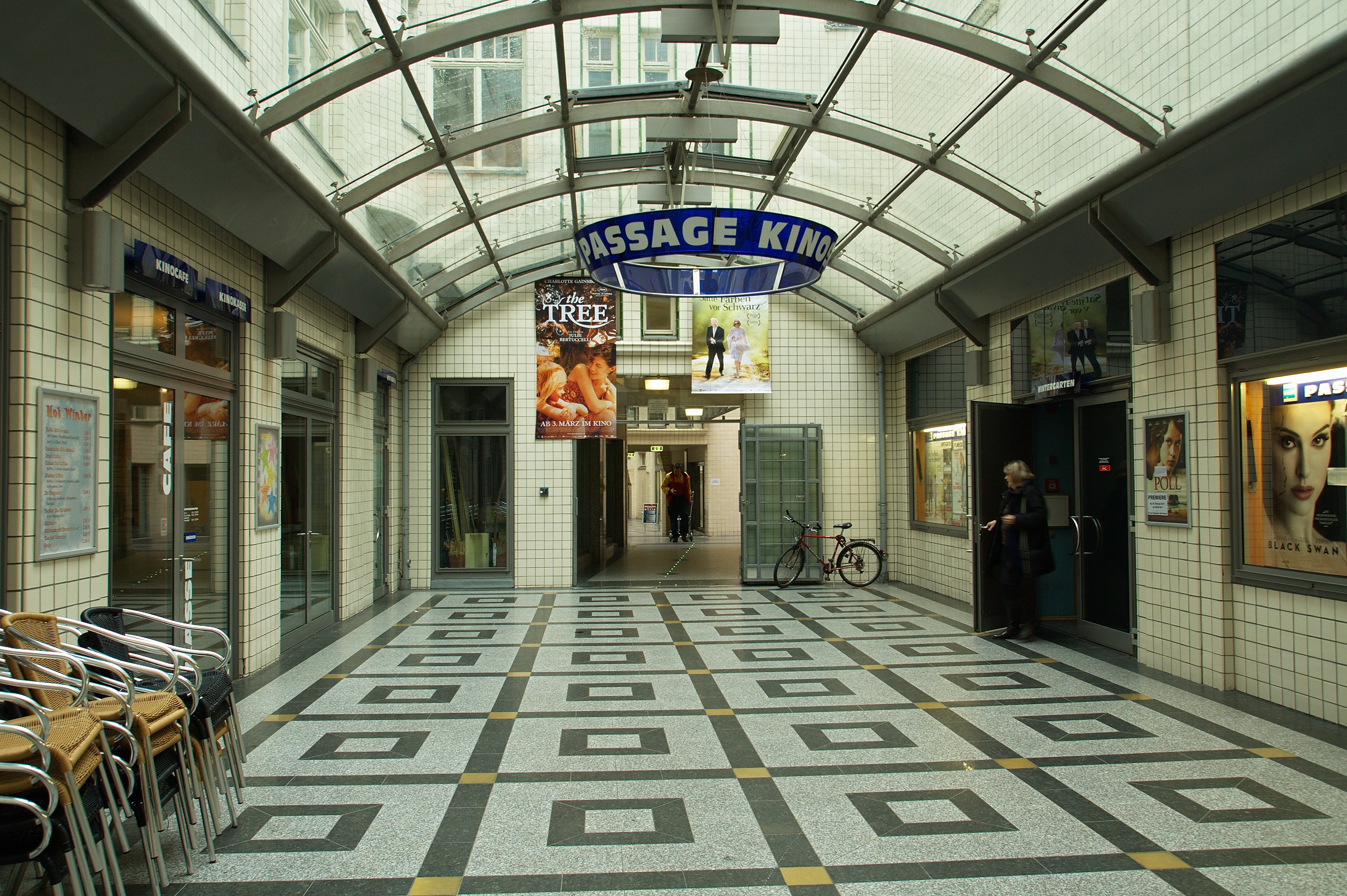
In the restored Jägerhof (2011)

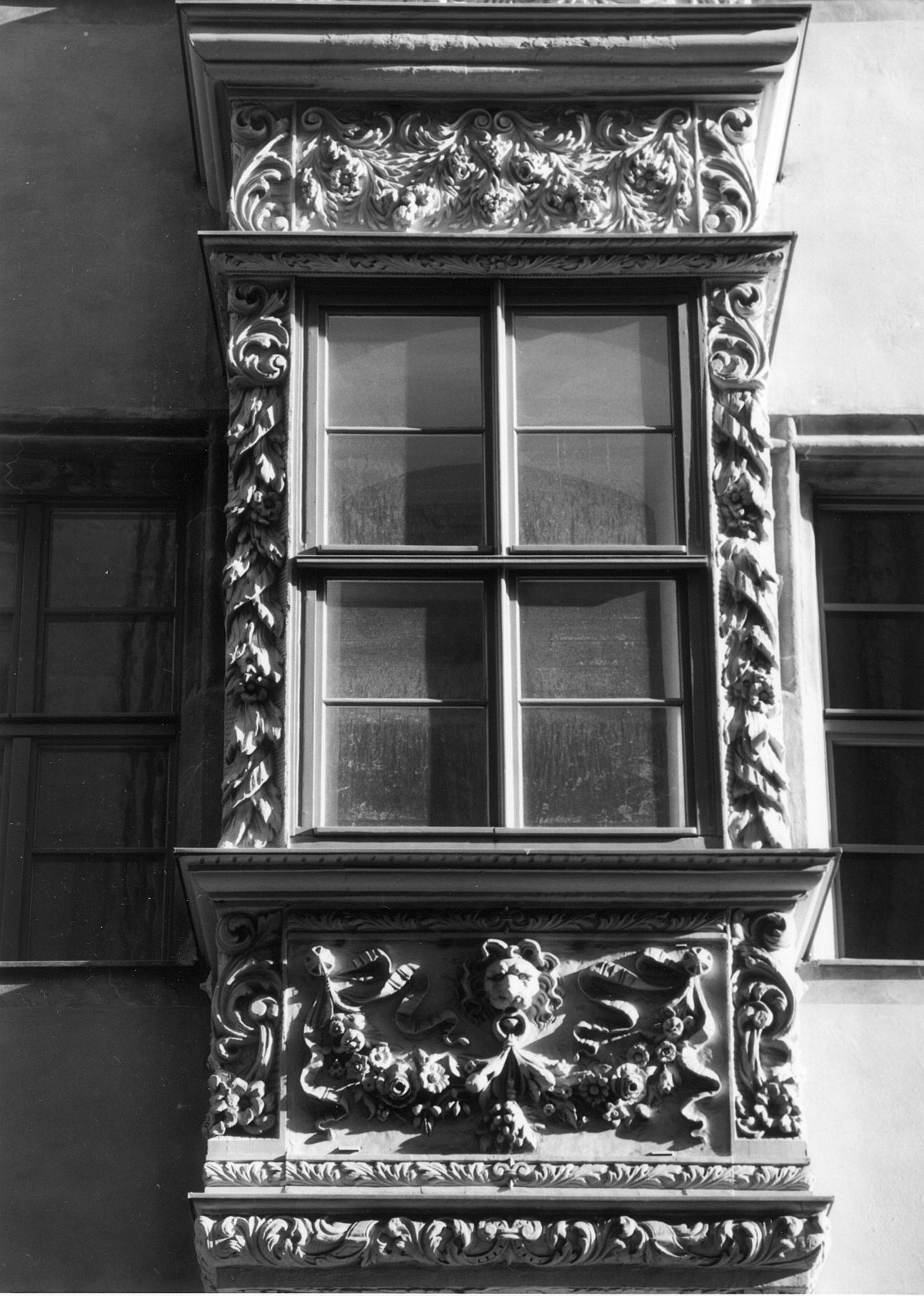
Baroque oriel window at house number 8 (2017)

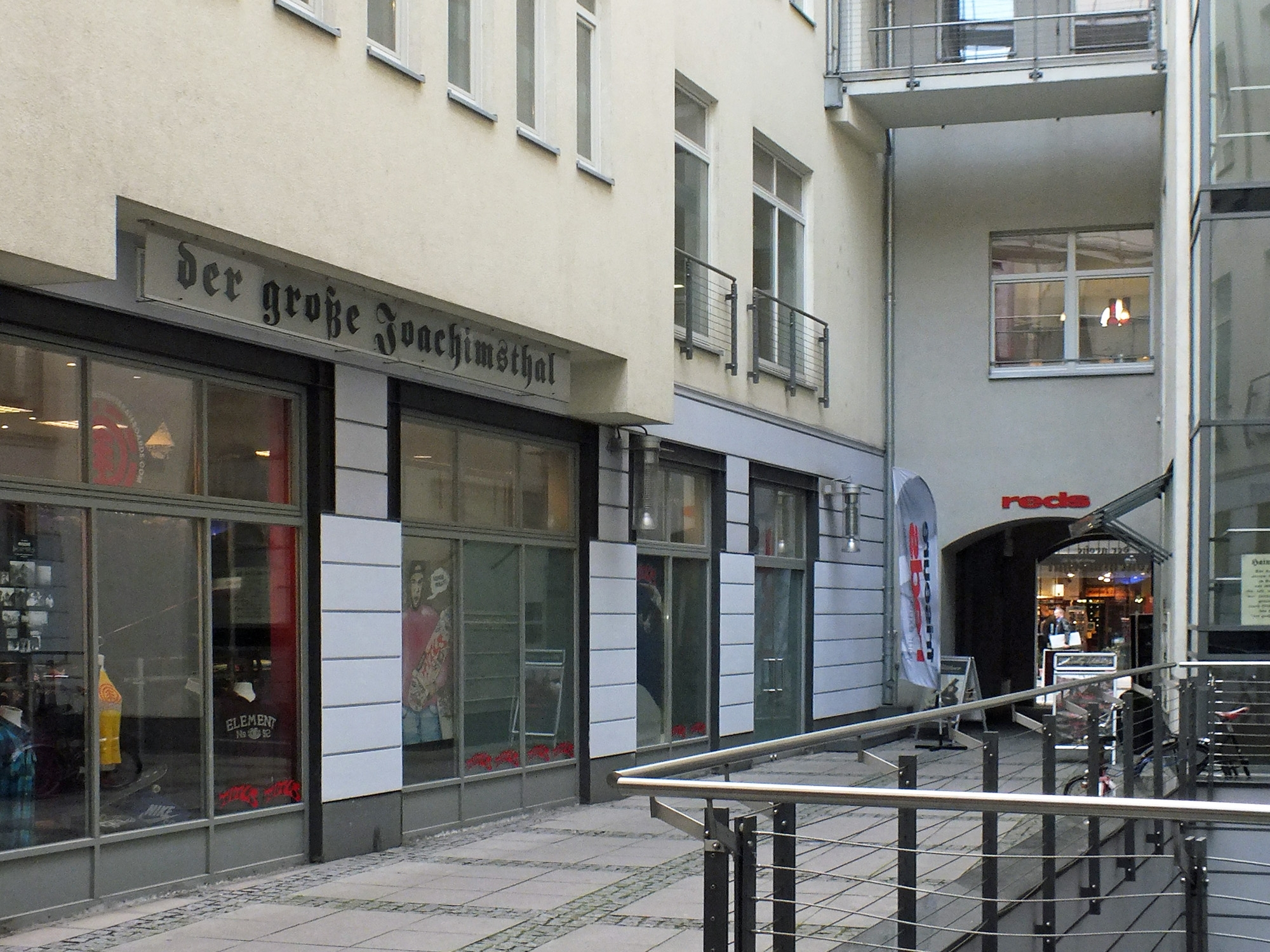
The Great Joachimsthal (2011)

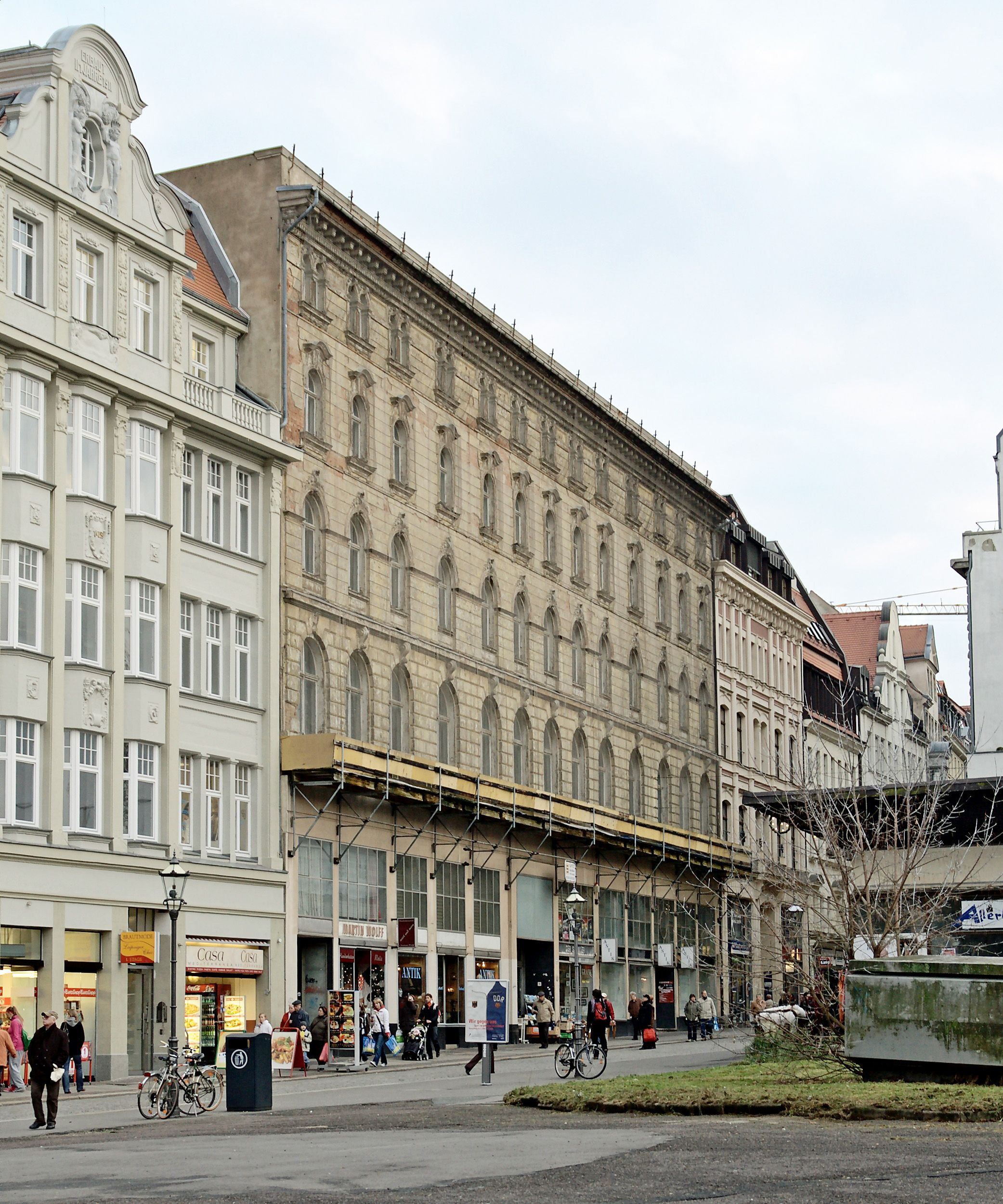
Hôtel de Pologne (2009)

The houses on the east side No. 4, 6, 8 and 10 as well as some on the opposite side have oriel windows that are worth seeing; The most beautiful is probably the baroque oriel window at house number 8. The passage Der Große Joachimsthal begins at number 10 and leads to Katharinenstraße 13. The Blauer und Goldener Stern (Blue and golden star) house has a passage to Kretschmanns Hof on Katharinenstrasse. The Hôtel de Pologne (No. 16-18), built in 1847/1848 by Eduard Pötzsch (1803–1889) and at that time the largest hotel in the city, has been an office building with shops on the ground floor since 2014 after an eventful history. The two historic halls have been restored and are used for festive events and conferences.

== See also ==
- List of arcade galleries in Leipzig
- List of streets and squares in Leipzig
