= Bowling Club =

- Bowlingtreff
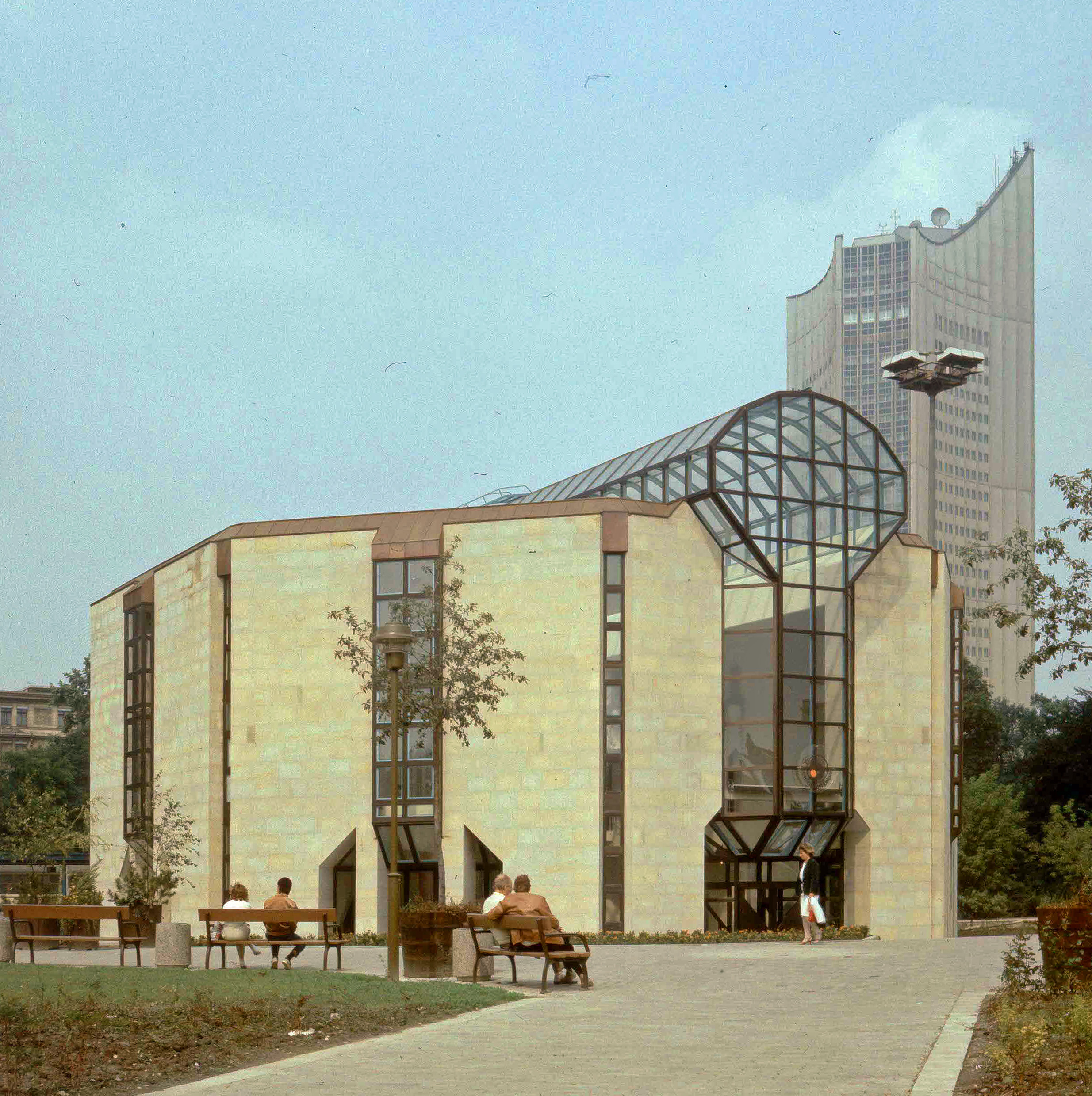
- Entrance building of the Bowling Club (1987)
- Interactive map of the Bowling Club area

General information
- Type: Public
- Architectural style: Postmodern architecture
- Location: Wilhelm-Leuschner-Platz 1, Leipzig, Germany
- Coordinates: 51.335679°N 12.376678°E
- Inaugurated: 25 July 1987
- Owner: Municipality

Design and construction
- Architect: Winfried Sziegoleit

The Bowling Club (German: Bowlingtreff) was a sports and leisure facility in Leipzig, Germany. It was built in 1987 in a former tram traction substation under the northern part of Wilhelm-Leuschner-Platz and was in operation until 1997. The facility, including the new above-ground entrance structure in the postmodern style, is a listed building as a testament to late GDR architecture.

In the future, the complex will house the Leipzig Natural History Museum.

== History ==
In 1925/1926, the underground tram traction substation Leipzig-Mitte was built on Rossplatz, south of the Promenadenring. It provided a stable direct current supply to the city center, including the tram, with incoming voltage fluctuations being balanced out by a large number of accumulators. In addition to the larger machine room, there was therefore also a smaller accumulator room. The facility was in use until 1965.

As early as the mid-1970s, plans were drawn up to use the disused facility for a leisure center. After this failed, a new contract was awarded in 1984 for a bowling center, during which an internal architectural design competition was held in January 1985. Winfried Sziegoleit (1939–2021) won the competition and his design was also realized. The execution project was taken over by a collective led by Volker Sieg (* 1937). Construction work began in June 1986, during which Leipzig citizens contributed 40,000 voluntary unpaid hours of work. After only thirteen months of construction, the bowling club was opened on 25 July 1987, on schedule for the "VIII. Turn- und Sportfest der DDR 1987" (8th Gymnastics and Sports Festival of the GDR). Since the construction of the Bowling Club was not included in any of the city's overarching plans and there was no government approval, it is sometimes referred to as the city's "illegal building".

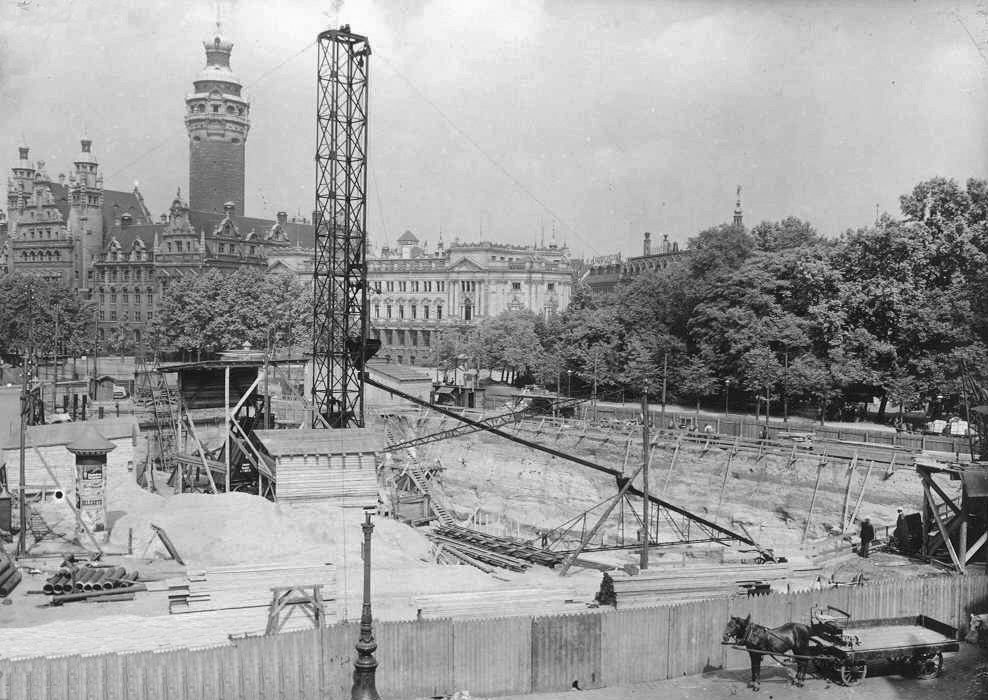
Excavation pit of the underground traction substation (1925)

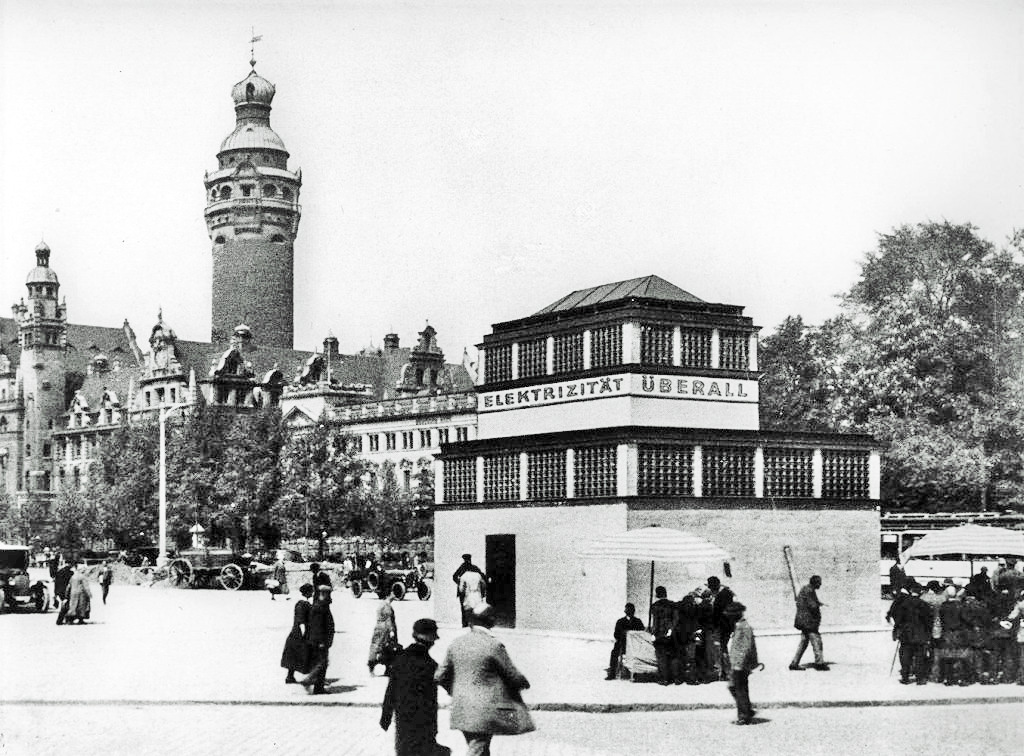
Entrance to the traction substation (around 1930)

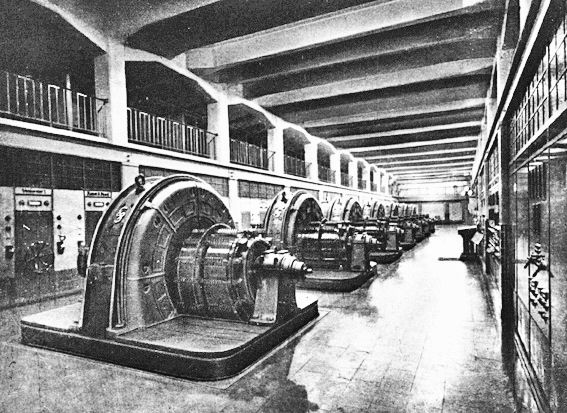
Machine hall (around 1930)

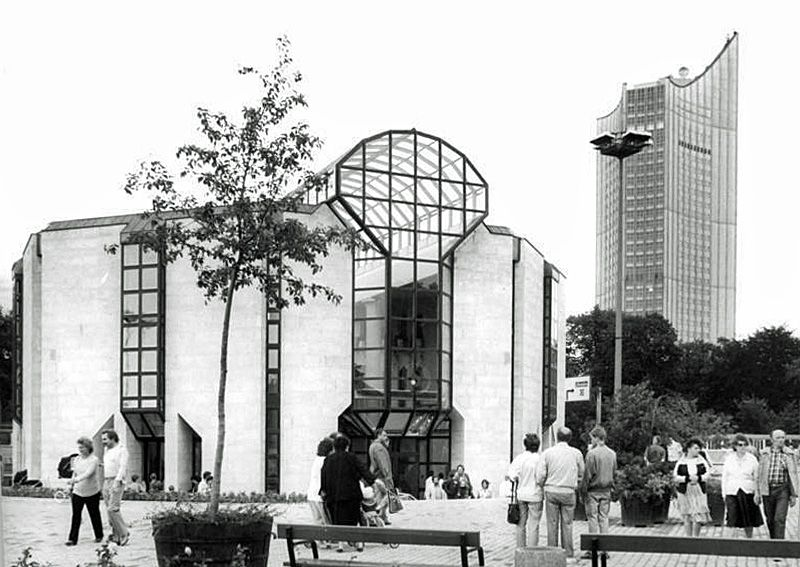
Bowling Club at the opening (1987)

The Bowling Club was well received. It was open for 15 hours a day and had an average of 2,000 to 2,500 guests. In 1997, the bowling club was closed for complex reasons. It was not until 2007 that the slowly decaying building was brought back to life for a week. The Leipzig University of Applied Sciences held its annual architecture exhibition to mark its 15th anniversary under the motto Bowling together!. In 2009, at the suggestion of the board of trustees of the Kulturstiftung Leipzig (Leipzig Cultural Foundation), a concept was developed to convert the Bowling Club into a cultural center. This was not realized because the city was considering accommodating a municipal facility. In 2014, the idea of using the listed building as a new location for the Natural History Museum was first raised, but this was rejected in the same year due to the high costs and a tender for the sale was launched instead. The Natural History Museum was to be housed in Hall 7 of the Leipziger Baumwollspinnerei, but this was cancelled in 2018. In October 2020, the city council confirmed that the Natural History Museum would be set up in the former Bowling Club.

== Description ==
The entrance building of the Bowling Club has a slightly elongated octagon with a side length of around 10 metres (33 ft). This is intended to be a certain reminiscence of the Panorama exhibition centre, which stood to the east of it until 1943 and was also polygonal, and later became an entertainment centre. The centre was around twice as large and had sixteen sides. The concrete sides, interrupted by window elements, are clad in Cotta sandstone like the Gewandhaus concert hall. The central axis is covered with a glass roof, reminiscent of the Leipzig tradition of arcades. There is a fountain bowl on the square in front of the entrance.

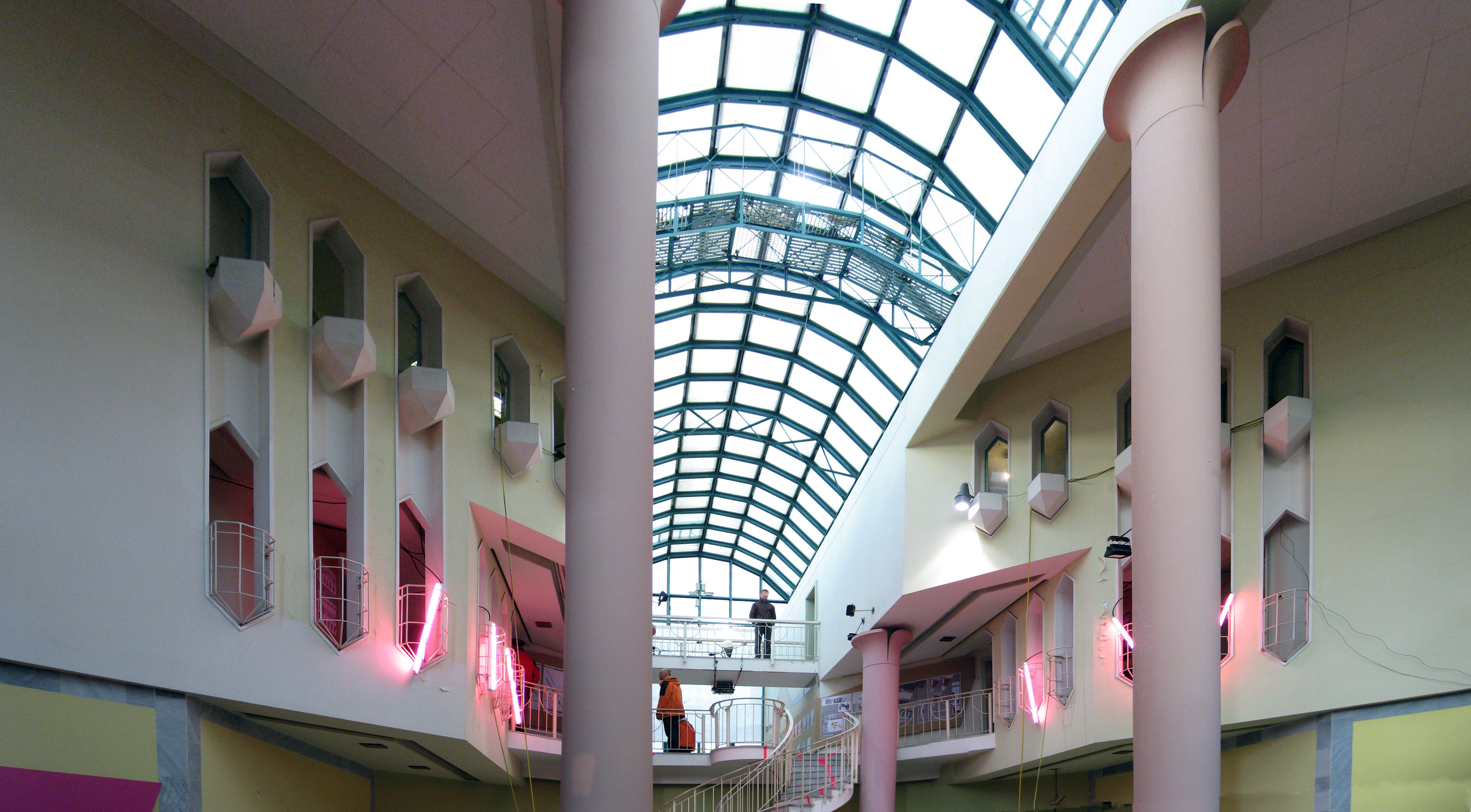
Entrance hall from the mezzanine level (2007)

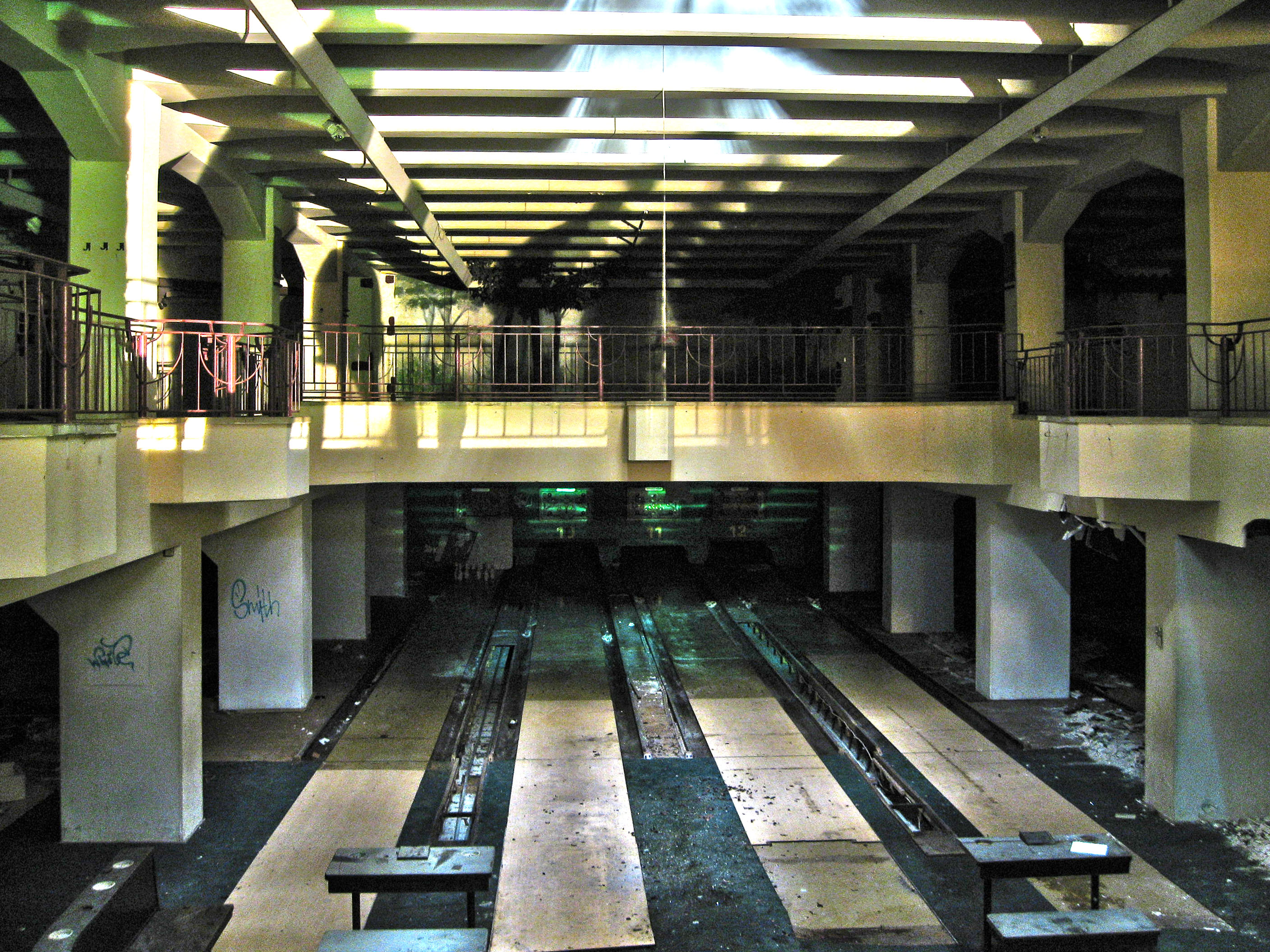
Remains of the bowling alleys in the machine hall (2007)

A few steps lead to the lower entrance. (There was also a disabled access.) A straight staircase flanked by reinforced concrete columns leads over an intermediate level to the lower reception hall, from which the two bowling halls lead off to the side. The bowling halls have skylights that are also visible from outside on the site. A winding staircase connects the intermediate level with the rear part of the ground floor.

The Bowling Club had eight and six bowling lanes in its two halls. On the balcony level in the large hall there were six pool tables and Poly-Play slot machines. There was a fitness room, a conference room, a skat room and offices. In addition to a café in the entrance building, there were further dining areas in the basement, with space for 310 guests in total.

== See also ==
- Architecture of Leipzig

== Literature ==
- Demshuk A. The People’s Bowling Palace: Building Underground in Late Communist Leipzig. Contemporary European History. 2020;29(3):339-355. doi:10.1017/S0960777320000107
- Hocquél, Wolfgang (2023). Architekturführer Leipzig. Von der Romanik bis zur Gegenwart (in German). Leipzig: Passage-Verlag. p. 154. ISBN 978-3-95415-128-8.
