= Leipzig-Mitte =

Leipzig-Mitte Stadtbezirk Mitte (Leipzig)
- Borough of Leipzig
- Location within Leipzig
- Interactive map of Leipzig-Mitte
- Location within Germany Location within Saxony
- Coordinates: 51°20′N 12°22′E
- Country: Germany
- State: Saxony
- District: Urban district
- City: Leipzig

Area
  - Total: 13.9 km^{2} (5.4 sq mi)
- Elevation: 112 m (367 ft)

Population (2022-06-30)
  - Total: 69,214
  - Density: 4,980/km^{2} (12,900/sq mi)
- Time zone: UTC+01:00 (CET)
  - Summer (DST): UTC+02:00 (CEST)
- Dialling codes: 0341
- Vehicle registration: L
- Website: www.leipzig.de

Leipzig-Mitte is one of ten boroughs (Stadtbezirke) of Leipzig, located in the center of the city. It includes numerous architectural monuments. Most of them are located in the subdivision "Zentrum", which is sited inside the Inner City Ring Road and the Promenadenring:

- the Opera,
- the Europahaus,
- the Gewandhaus,
- the City-Hochhaus at the Augustusplatz,
- the Wintergartenhochhaus,
- the St. Thomas Church,
- the St. Nicholas Church,
- the New Town Hall,
- the Old Town Hall at the Markt square,
- the Leipzig University.

In the southwest of the borough, there is located a part of the Clara-Zetkin-Park and the Federal Administrative Court. In the northern part of the borough, there are Leipzig Zoo and Leipzig Central Station. In the south-east of the borough, there are the Bavarian train station, the Russian Memorial Church and the Alte Messe near the Monument to the Battle of the Nations in the neighboring borough of Probstheida.

The exit Leipzig-Mitte of the Bundesautobahn 14 is situated about 5 kilometres (3 miles) away in the north of Leipzig.

== View ==
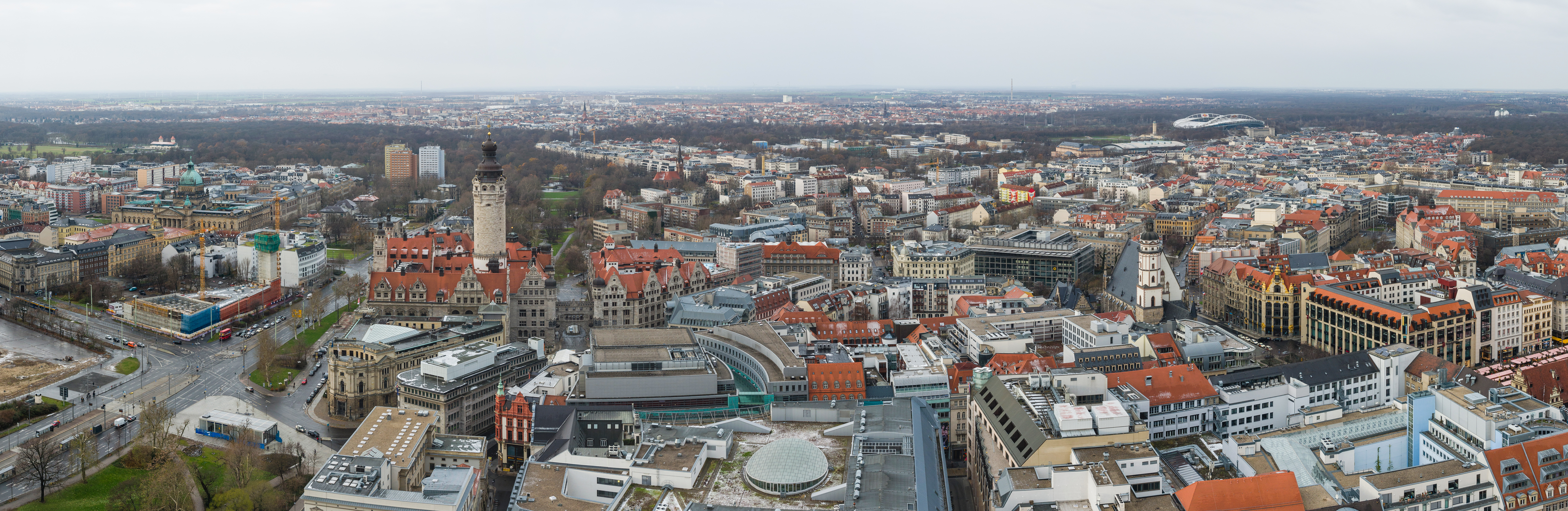
View from the City-Hochhaus at the western parts of the district Mitte

== Localities ==
In Leipzig, the subdivisions of the boroughs are called Ortsteil (localities). In the borough Leipzig-Mitte, there are these 7 Ortsteile:

00 Zentrum

01 Zentrum-Ost

02 Zentrum-Südost

03 Zentrum-Süd

04 Zentrum-West

05 Zentrum-Nordwest

06 Zentrum-Nord

The locality of Zentrum-Nordwest includes the quarter Waldstraßenviertel. The locality of Zentrum-West includes the quarters of Bachviertel and Innere Westvorstadt. The locality of Zentrum-Süd includes the Musikviertel.

== Population ==
On 30 June 2022, the borough Leipzig-Mitte had a population of 69,214.

== History and urban development ==
The development of today's Leipzig began in the area of today's Mitte borough. In the Brühl area, there was in the 7th/8th century a Slavic settlement, while the urban nucleus was in the area of the German castle (urbs libzi). It was in the area of today's Matthäikirchhof. Not far from there, the long-distance trade routes Via regia and Via imperii crossed in the Middle Ages, with the latter still being present in today's street name Reichsstraße.

In the 13th century, the city of Leipzig extended only to the north beyond today's subdivision Zentrum and was limited to 42 hectares (100 acres) by the mighty city walls. Today's Mitte borough, on the other hand, also includes the suburbs, which essentially only developed after the gradual removal of the walls and ditches after the Seven Years' War. Previously, these were due to war events (Schmalkaldic War and Thirty Years' War) almost completely destroyed twice. Until the 1830s, only small areas outside of today's Zentrum were developed. These were limited to the trade routes accompanying the road, which were referred to as Steinweg (stone track). The city limits were pushed outwards and new gatehouses were built (within the Mitte borough).

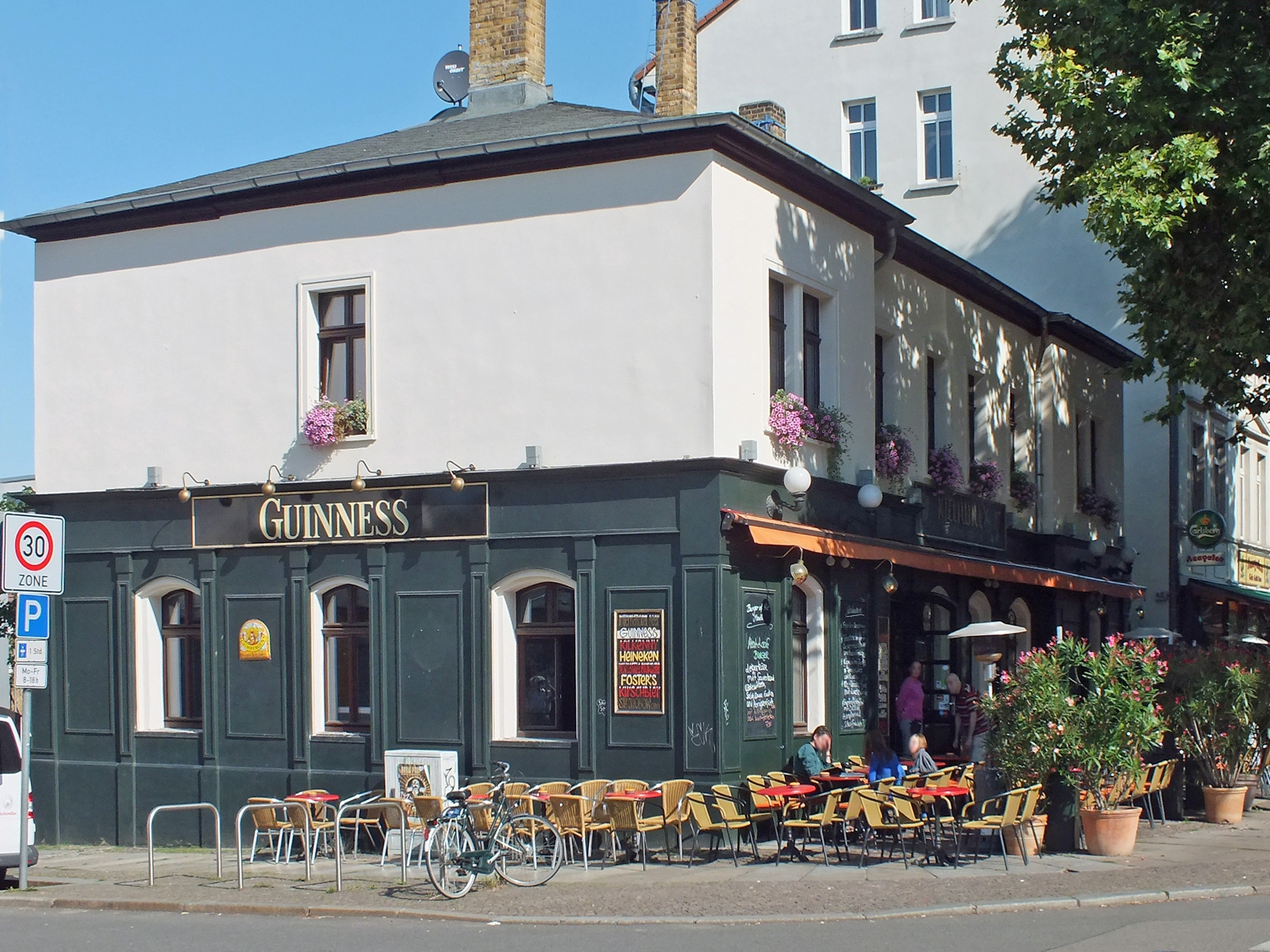
Gatehouse of the former Zeitz Gate of 1856 at the town boundary in today's Karl-Liebknecht-Straße (2013)

The area later called Alt-Leipzig (Old Leipzig) corresponds roughly, but not exactly, with today's Mitte borough. An important prerequisite for the development of its northwestern, western and southwestern areas were the plans of the hydraulic engineers Kohl and Georgi in the years 1852 to 1854 and the subsequent redesign of the Leipzig River Network. In the course of the 19th century, the extensive public gardens that surrounded the inner city on all sides were gradually subdivided and built on. This led to a strong structural expansion of the suburbs, whereby Leipzig exceeded the 100,000-inhabitant mark in 1870 and became a big city. Due to incorporations, the urban area was soon no longer limited to Alt-Leipzig. In the census of 1895, a distinction was made between Alt-Leipzig with 183,000 people and Neu-Leipzig (New Leipzig) with 207,000 people. The population density was three times as high as it is today in the borough of Mitte, whose developed structure around 1900 was roughly as it is today.

However, this does not change the fact that, as Sebastian Ringel proves, hardly one stone has been left unturned and many buildings have been replaced by new ones over the course of time. Starting with the construction of the main train station, through the bombing of Leipzig in World War II (degree of destruction in the Mitte borough between 34 and 52%) and the changing reconstruction in the GDR, entire squares and streets disappeared. The increasing number of vehicles per capita in the 20th century and the expansion of roads also led to major changes in the cityscape.

Towards the end of the 20th century, the concept of a city center with few cars prevailed, while the inner city ring road has the highest traffic occupancy in Leipzig after the motorways. With the S-Bahn city tunnel opened in 2013, the Mitte borough has received a total of 4 underground train stations.

In 1989, the Mitte district made its place in world history with the Leipzig Monday demonstrations, which accelerated the end of the GDR and the Eastern bloc.

== Attractions ==
=== Churches ===
- Propsteikirche, Leipzig
- St. Peter, Leipzig

=== Buildings ===
- Alte Handelsbörse
- Arena Leipzig
- Auerbachs Keller
- Barthels Hof
- Bosehaus
- Bowling Club
- Constitutional Court of Saxony
- Federal Court of Justice
- Höfe am Brühl
- Kongreßhalle Leipzig
- Kroch High-rise
- Moritzbastei
- Old St Nicholas School
- Paulinum (University of Leipzig)
- Red Bull Arena (Leipzig)
- Reich Court building
- Romanus House
- Specks Hof

=== Lost buildings ===
- All Saints' Church, Leipzig
- Altes Theater (Leipzig)
- Augusteum (Leipzig)
- Café Zimmermann
- Leipzig Synagogue
- Paulinerkirche, Leipzig
- Pleissenburg
- Saint John's Church, Leipzig
- Zentralstadion (1956)

=== Underground railway stations ===
- Leipzig Markt station
- Leipzig Wilhelm-Leuschner-Platz railway station

=== Streets, squares and bridges ===
- Barfußgäßchen
- Burgplatz
- Goerdelerring
- Gottschedstrasse
- Grimmaische Strasse
- Hainstrasse
- Katharinenstrasse
- Petersstrasse
- Ranstädter Steinweg
- Richard-Wagner-Platz
- St. Nicholas Church Square
- St. Thomas Church Square
- The Saxons' Bridge
- Zeppelin Bridge

=== Education and science ===
- St. Thomas School, Leipzig
- University of Music and Theatre Leipzig
- Leibniz Institute for the History and Culture of Eastern Europe
- Forum Thomanum
- German Central Library for the Blind
- German National Library
- HHL Leipzig Graduate School of Management
- Hochschule für Grafik und Buchkunst Leipzig

=== Museums ===
- Leipzig City History Museum
- Galerie für Zeitgenössische Kunst Leipzig
- German Museum of Books and Writing
- Grassi Museum
- Leipzig Museum of Applied Arts
- Leipzig Museum of Ethnography
- Museum der bildenden Künste
- Museum of Antiquities of Leipzig University
- Museum of Musical Instruments of Leipzig University
- Natural History Museum, Leipzig
- Saxon Psychiatric Museum
- Zeitgeschichtliches Forum Leipzig
- Zum Arabischen Coffe Baum

=== Cemeteries ===
- Alter Johannisfriedhof

=== Other attractions ===
- Leipzig City Harbour
- Johannapark
- Rosental
- Leipzig Botanical Garden
- Racecourse Scheibenholz
- Statue of J. S. Bach
- Richard Wagner Memorial
- Bust of Richard Wagner
- The Step of the Century
- Bridge blasting monument

=== Events ===
- Bachfest Leipzig
- Dok Leipzig
- Leipzig Christmas Market

== Literature ==
- Bürgerverein Waldstraßenviertel e.V., Gründer. Zeit. Geist. Leipzig wird Großstadt 1871, Das Buch zur Ausstellung, o.J., in German (A book regarding an exhibition)
- Heydick, Lutz (1990): Leipzig. Historischer Führer zu Stadt und Land, Urania-Verlag, Leipzig - Jena - Berlin 1990, ISBN 3-332-00337-2, in German
- Hocquél, Wolfgang (2004): Leipzig. Architektur von der Romanik bis zur Gegenwart, Passage-Verlag, Leipzig, 2. stark erweiterte Auflage 2004, ISBN 3-932900-54-5, in German
- Künnemann, Otto / Güldemann, Martina (2004): Geschichte der Stadt Leipzig, Wartberg Verlag, Gudensberg-Gleichen, 2. Auflage, 2004, ISBN 3-86134-909-4, in German
- Leonhardi, Friedrich Gottlob (1799): Leipzig um 1800, kommentierte und mit einem Register versehene Neuausgabe der Geschichte und Beschreibung der Kreis- und Handelsstadt Leipzig (1799), Lehmstedt-Verlag, Leipzig 2010, ISBN 978-3-942473-03-3, in: German
- Ringel, Sebastian (2015): Leipzig! One Thousand Years of History, Edition Leipzig in the Seemann Henschel GmbH Co. KG, Leipzig 2015, ISBN 978-3-361-00710-9, in English
- Ringel, Sebastian (2019): Wie Leipzigs Innenstadt verschwunden ist. 150 verlorene Bauten aus 150 Jahren. edition überland, Leipzig 2019, ISBN 978-3-948049-00-3, in German
- Ringel, Sebastian (2022): Vom Wandel der Leipziger Vorstädte. 300 verlorene Bauten aus 160 Jahren. edition überland, Leipzig 2022, ISBN 978-3-948049-07-2, in German
- Topfstedt, Thomas (1992): Leipzig: Messestadt am Ring, in: Neue Städte aus Ruinen. Deutscher Städtebau der Nachkriegszeit, Prestel Verlag, München 1992, ISBN 3-7913-1164-6, p. 182–196, in German
- Winkler, Friedemann (1998): Leipzigs Anfänge. Bekanntes, Neues, offene Fragen, ed. by Leipziger Geschichtsverein e.V., Sax-Verlag Beucha, 1998, ISBN 3-930076-61-6 (in German)
