= Alexander Julius Reichert =

German entomologist (1859–1939)

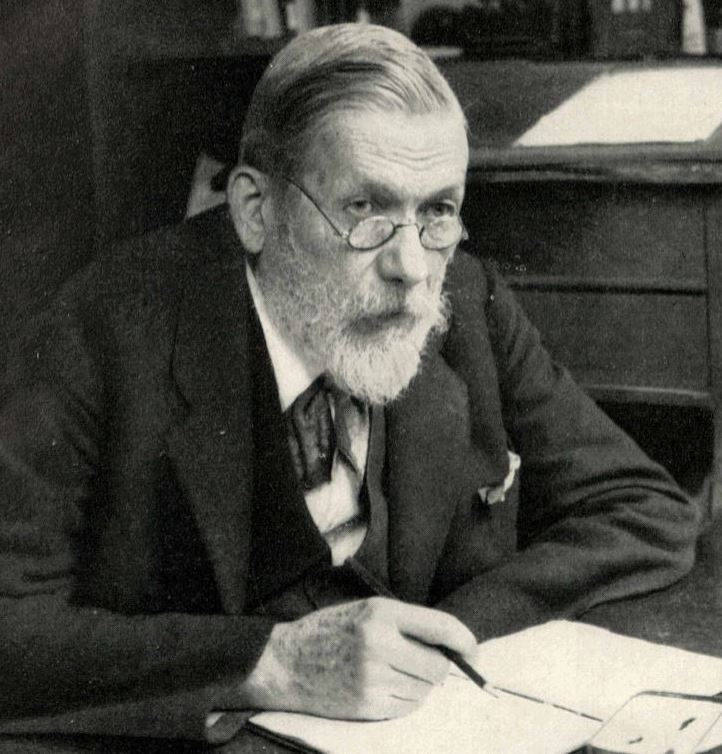
Alexander Reichert in Leipzig

Alexander Julius Reichert (25 January 1859 – 1 July 1939) was a German entomologist specialising in Lepidoptera. His collection is in Naturkundemuseum Leipzig and the Zoological Institute in the University of Leipzig.
