= Barthels Hof =

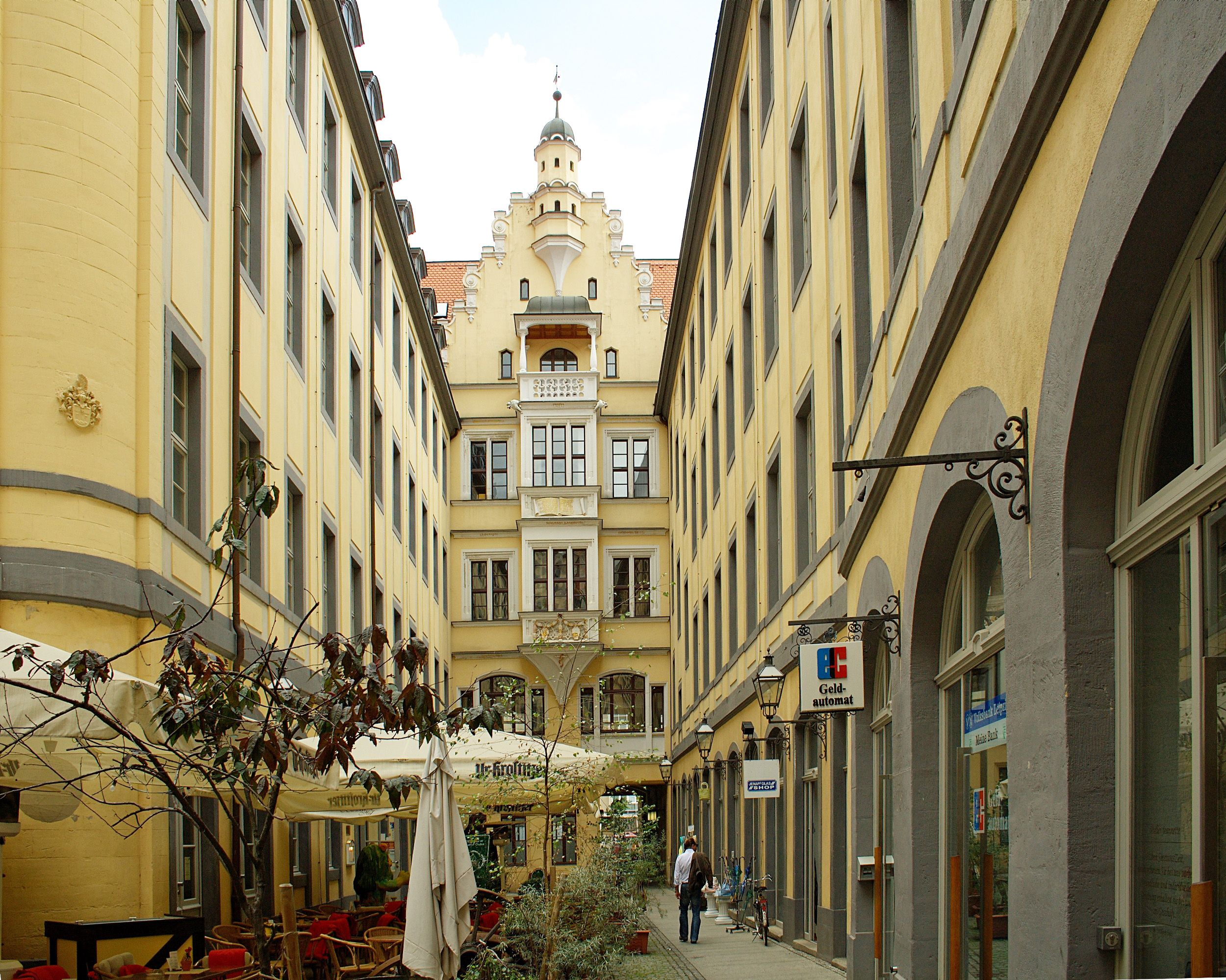
- Barthels Hof, view through the courtyard from west to east
- Interactive map of the Barthels Hof area

General information
- Type: Trade court building
- Architectural style: Baroque
- Location: Markt 8, Hainstraße 1 / Kleine Fleischergasse 2, Leipzig, Germany
- Coordinates: 51.341111°N 12.374167°E
- Construction started: 1747
- Completed: 1750
- Renovated: 1994-1997
- Client: Gottlieb Barthel (1750)
- Owner: Litos Barthels Hof GmbH & Co. KG (2023)

Design and construction
- Architect: George Werner (1750)
- Architecture firm: RKW architects (1997)

Website
- https://www.barthelshof.de/

Barthels Hof is a former trade court building complex in Leipzig in Germany, located in the borough Mitte. It is the last “through courtyard” that was preserved almost in its original condition. That means, the carts drove in, the goods were unloaded, and the carts drove out - without turning around. The horses were stabled in the suburbs. Later, from 1893 on, only samples of the goods were shown in the trade fairs and made to order. The Barthels Hof stretches from the market square to Kleine Fleischergasse and is now one of the city's most important sights. Today, it is used for a restaurant and some small shops.

== History ==
Barthels Hof was built between 1747 and 1750 by George Werner (1682-1758) for the Leipzig merchant Gottlieb Barthel, when ″Leipzig was one of the leading trade and trade-fair cities on the continent". The baroque facade facing Fleischergasse is very narrow and inconspicuous, in contrast to the big building complex behind it. Four-story houses are arranged around the irregularly shaped courtyard, all of which have very high roofs. There are no horizontal lines or cornices on this building, which means that the courtyard appears to be striving upwards. There were open sales vaults on the ground floor of the through house, which were closed with shutters. There are still two shops with these sales vaults in their original condition. Typical shops in the 18th century were such for fancy goods, cloth shops, shops that offered wigs or also crinolines which were later called hoop skirts in a modified form. There were representative ballrooms on the upper floor. The remaining parts of the building contained living rooms. The fact that the attics were used as goods storage can still be seen today from the crane beams that were used to lift the goods up.

The neo-baroque sandstone facade on the market side was created in 1870/1871. The Renaissance facade of the house “Zur goldenen Schlange” (Golden serpent) with its two-story bay window, dutch gable and attached turret was moved from the market to the courtyard side. The bay window dates from 1523 and is the oldest surviving fragment of a town house facade in Leipzig. A gilded snake wound around a cross on the console stone of the bay window gave its name to the house, which was built for the merchant Hieronymus Walther. The Walther family coat of arms can be seen in the parapet above the console stone. Above the lower window of the bay window there is another parapet panel with an open book and a Latin inscription that refers to the builder and the original year of construction, 1523.

== 20th century ==
In August 1928, a broadcasting station named Mitteldeutscher Rundfunk AG (MIRAG) moved into two floors of Barthels Hof, which gave it the name MIRAG House at this time. From 1946 to 1984, Barthels Hof was the headquarters of the Leipzig City Library and temporarily also of the Leipzig Trade Fair Office. In the 1990s, Barthels Hof belonged to the bankruptcy estate of the real estate entrepreneur Jürgen Schneider, who left behind a construction site here. The work could be continued by other investors. During the renovation, the building was almost completely gutted; only the vault of the restaurant and a few staircases remained in their original form. Today, Barthels Hof is home to numerous shops and the traditional restaurant “Barthels Hof”, which has been offering typical Saxon cuisine for over a century.

Historical views

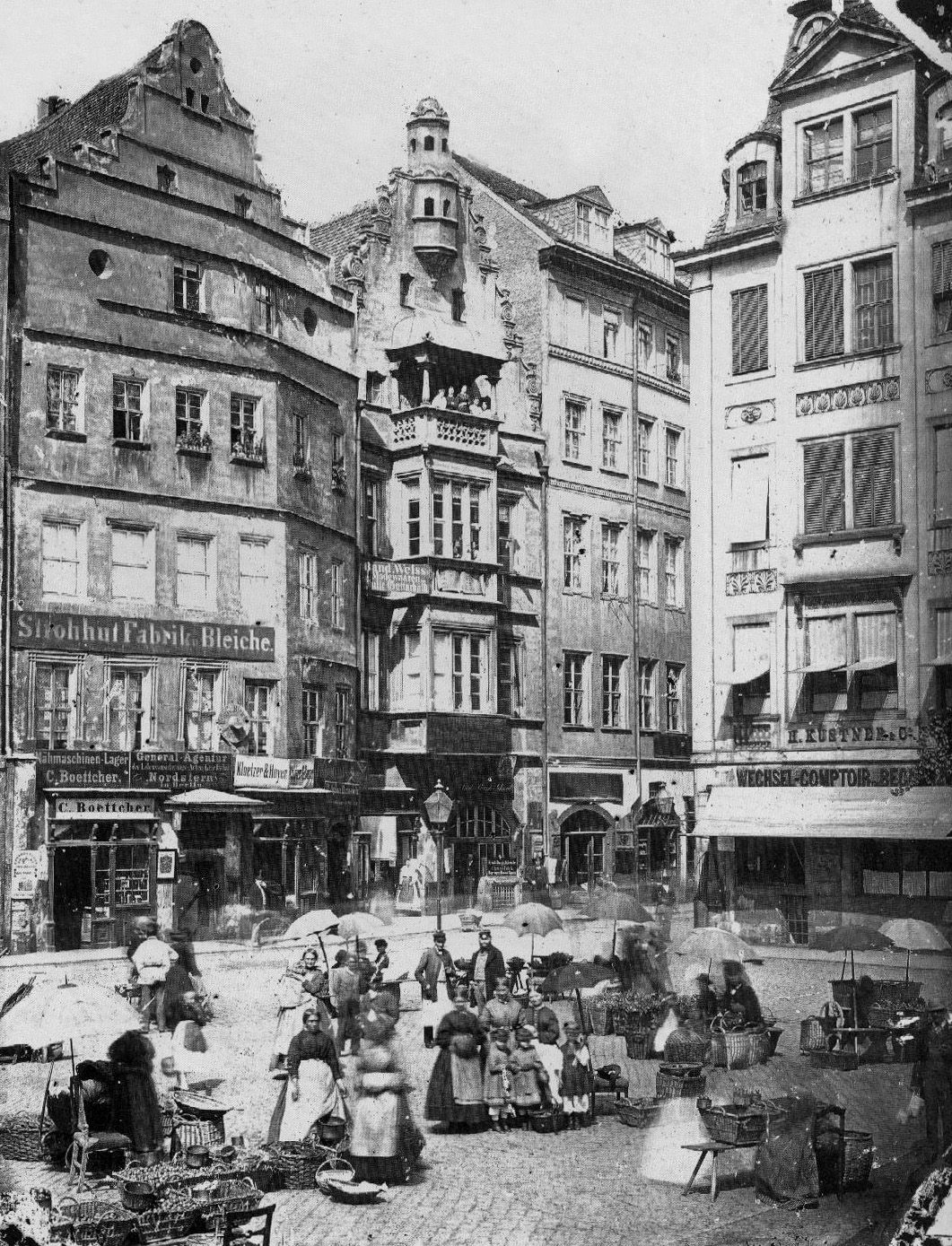
Barthels Hof, seen from the market (before 1870)

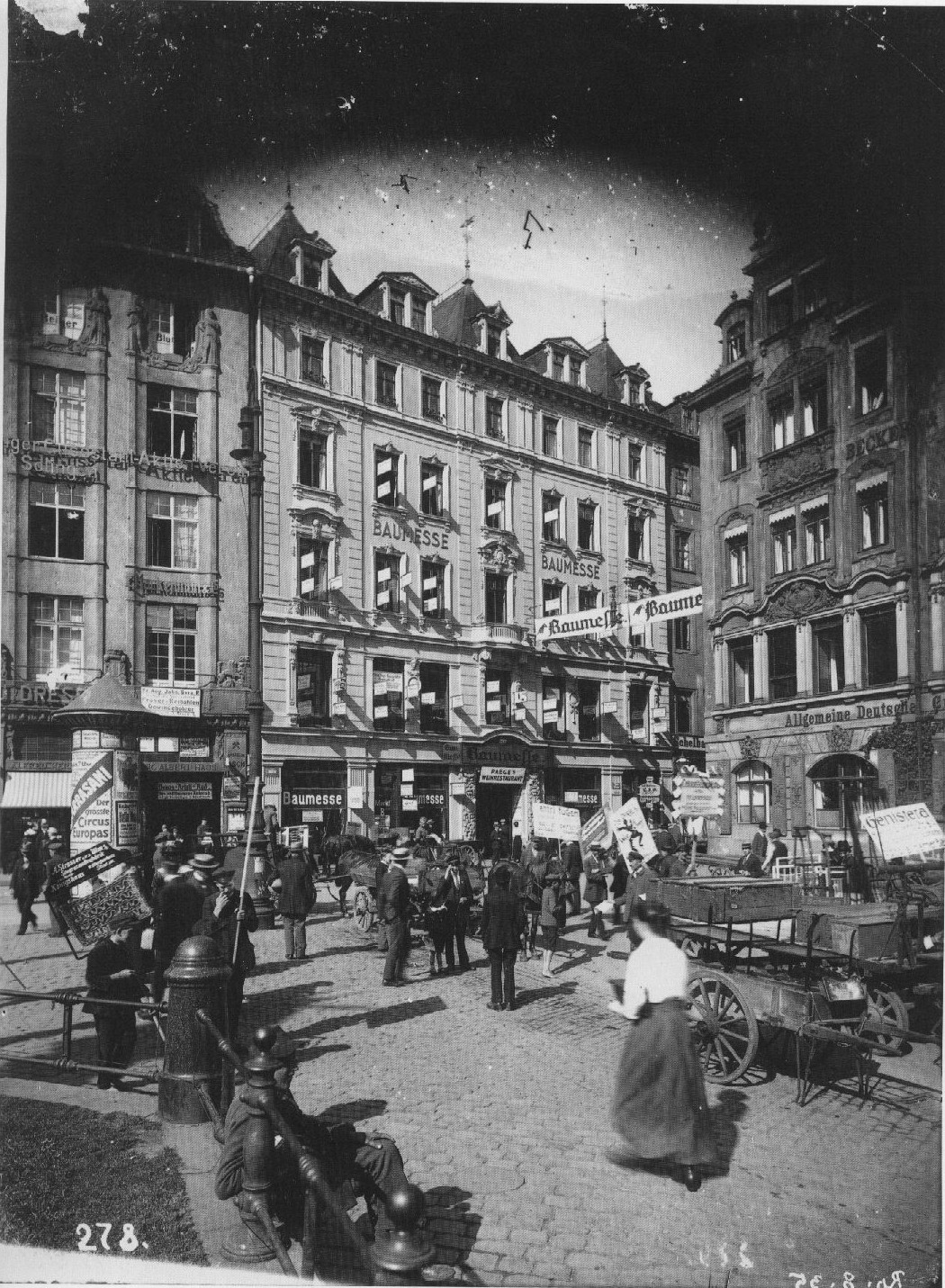
Barthels Hof, seen from the market (around 1890)

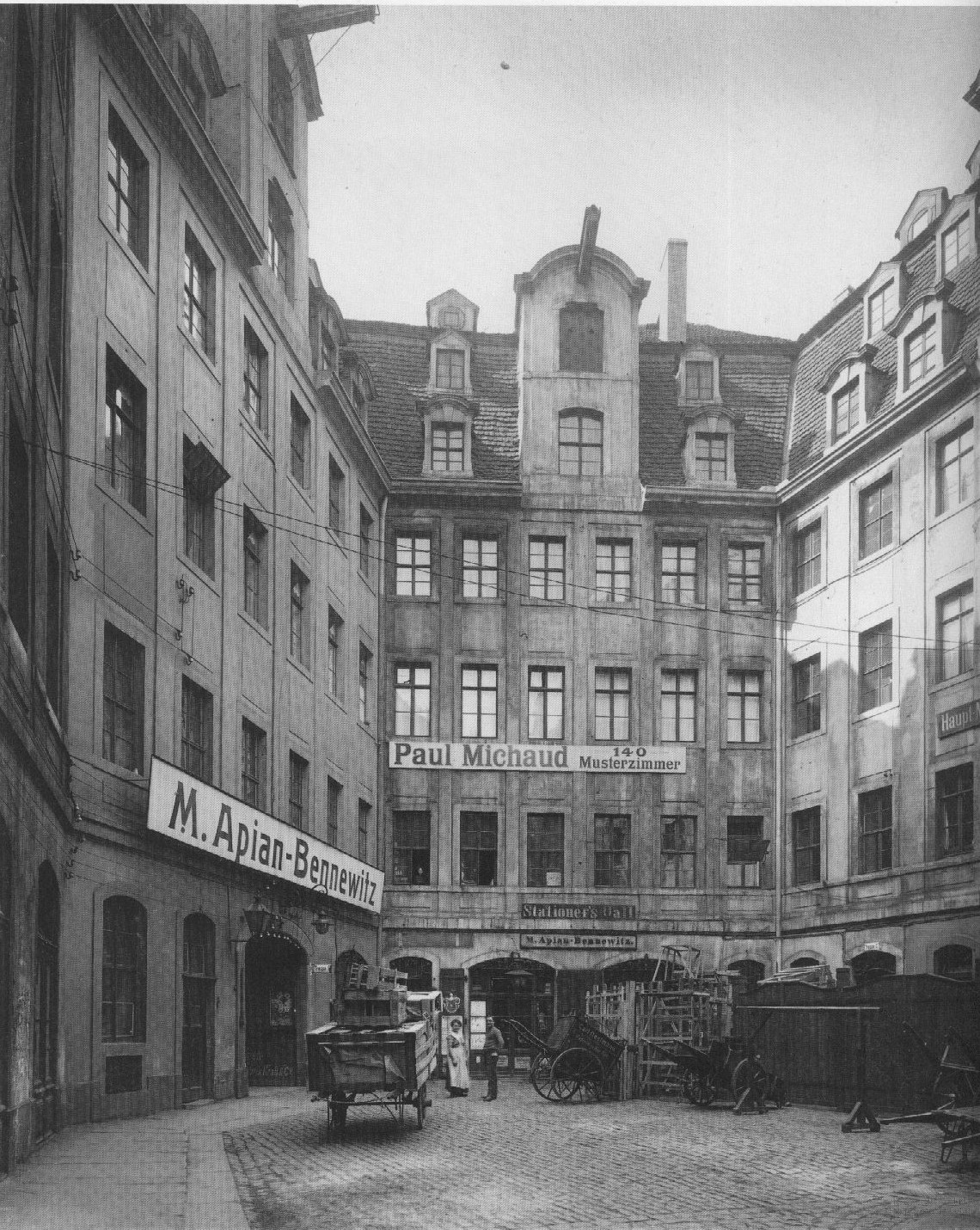
Barthels Hof, seen from the courtyard to the west (around 1890)

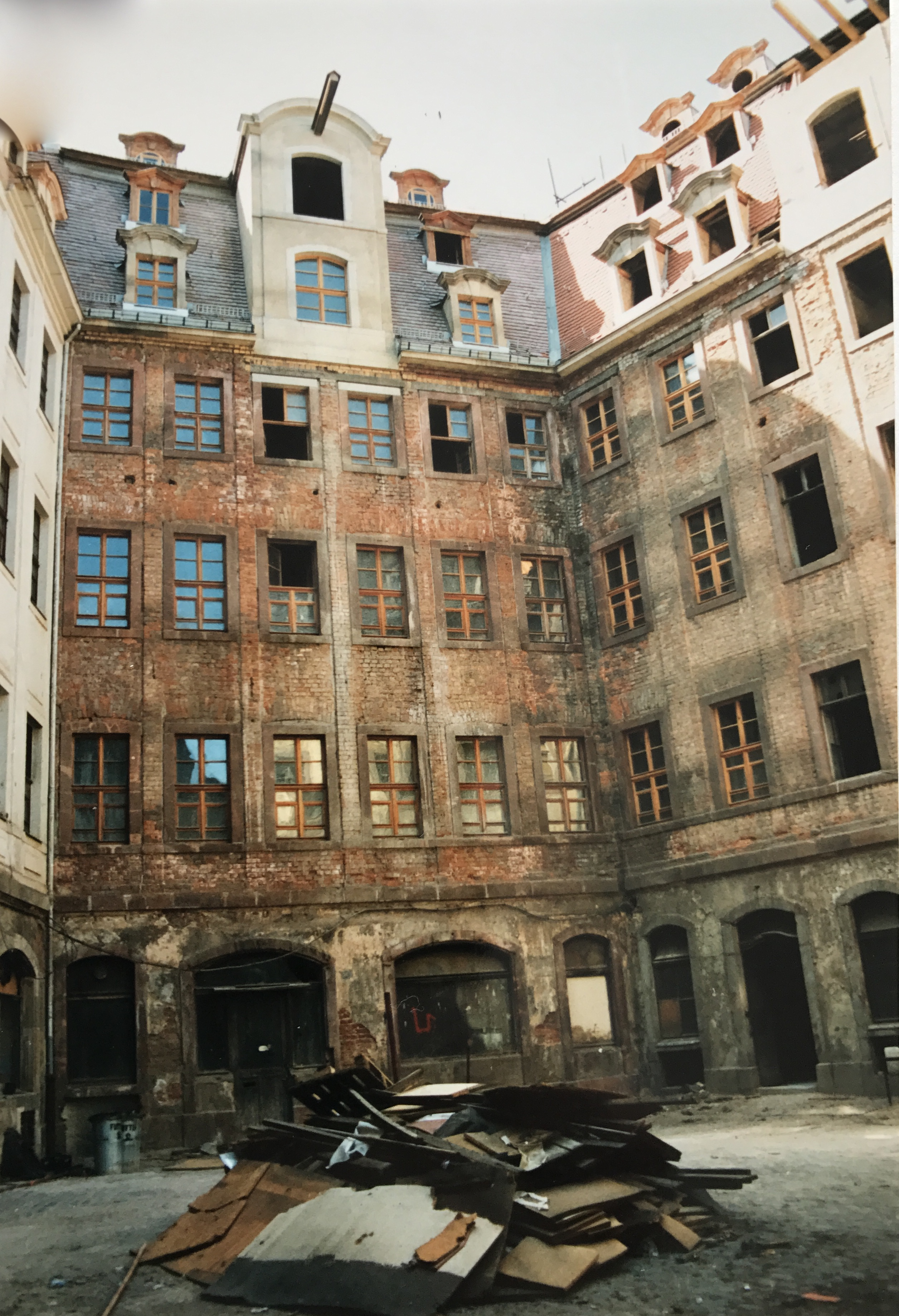
Courtyard to the west (bad condition around 1991)

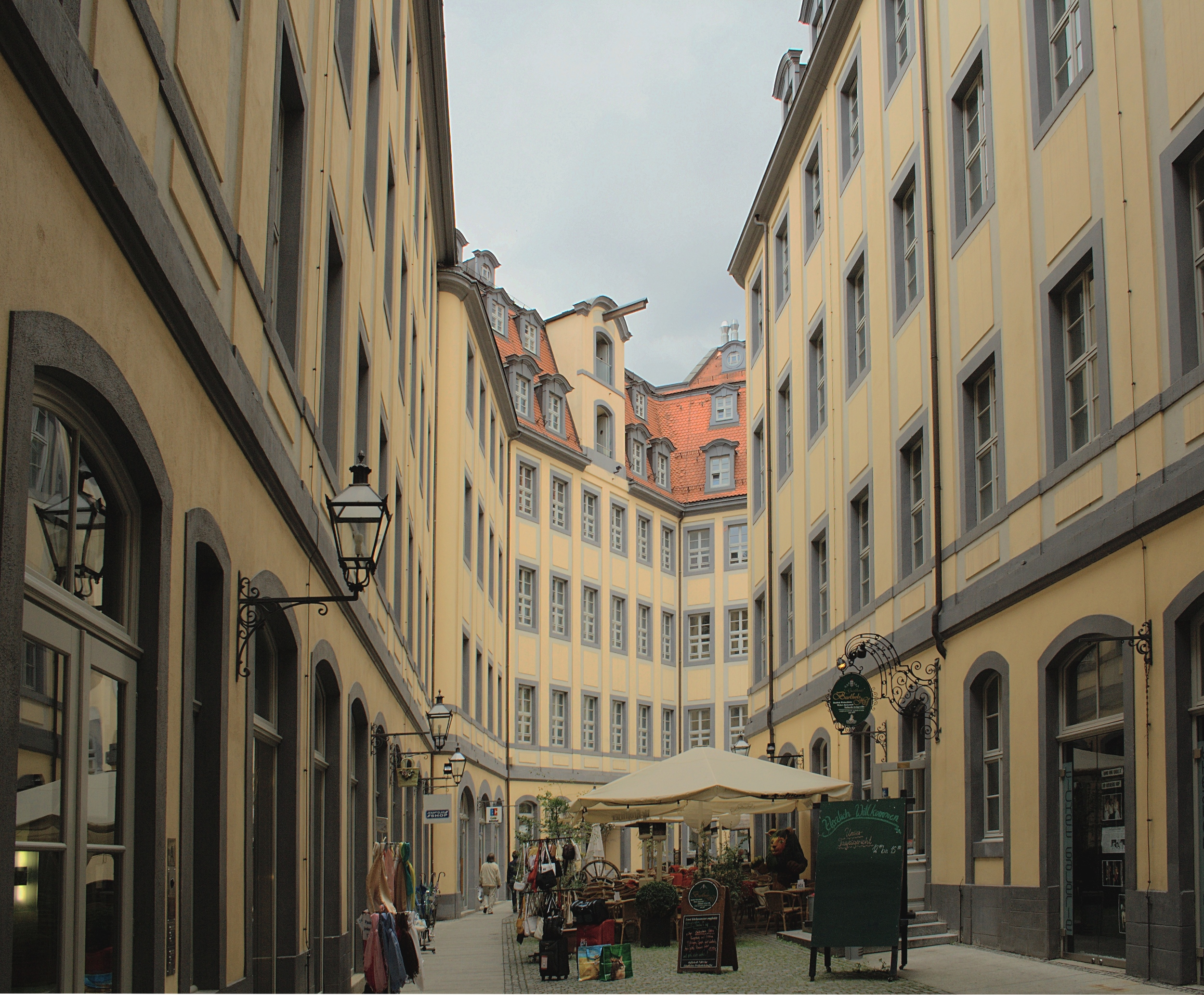
Court to the West (2009)

== See also ==
- Architecture of Leipzig - Baroque era
- List of arcade galleries in Leipzig
