= Markt (Leipzig) =

Square in Leipzig, Germany

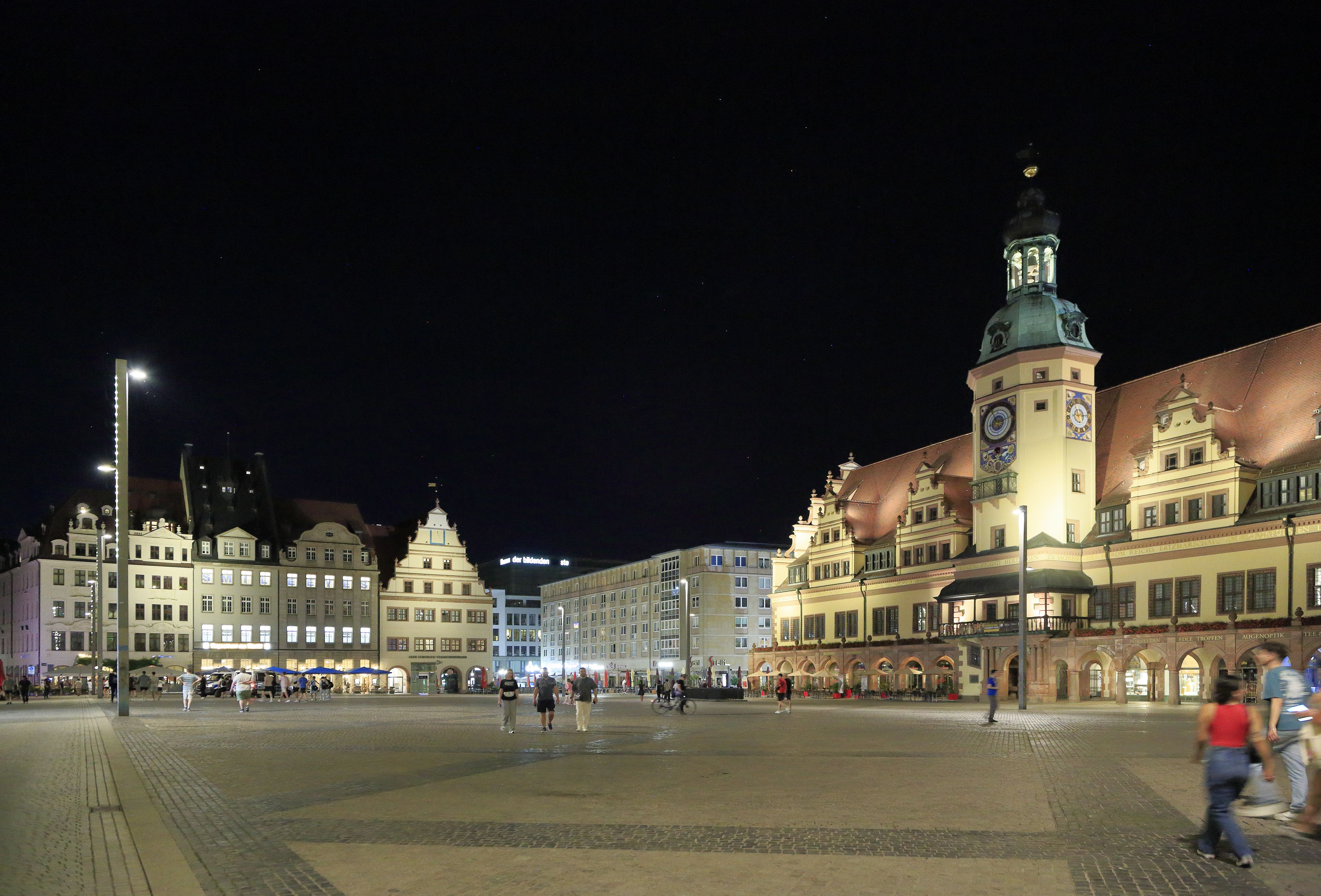
- Markt (Market Square) in Leipzig
- Interactive map of Markt
- Former name: Platz des Friedens (1950-1954)
- Length: 140 m (460 ft)
- Width: 70 m (230 ft)
- Location: Leipzig-Mitte, Leipzig, Germany
- Postal code: 04109
- Coordinates: 51°20′26.15″N 12°22′28.88″E

The Markt (lit.: market) is a square of about 1 ha (2.5 acres) in Leipzig's district of Mitte (neighborhood Zentrum), Germany. It is considered the center of the city. The Old Town Hall stands on it, which demonstrates its particular historical importance. The square was named Platz des Friedens (lit.: Peace Square) from 1950 to 1954. Its paving is a listed heritage monument.

== Shape ==
The Markt is an almost rectangular square, about 140 m (459.3 ft) long, with its larger extension running almost exactly from north to south. Its mean width is about 70 m (229.7 ft), being about 12 m (39.4 ft) wider in the north than in the south. Seven inner-city streets lead to it.

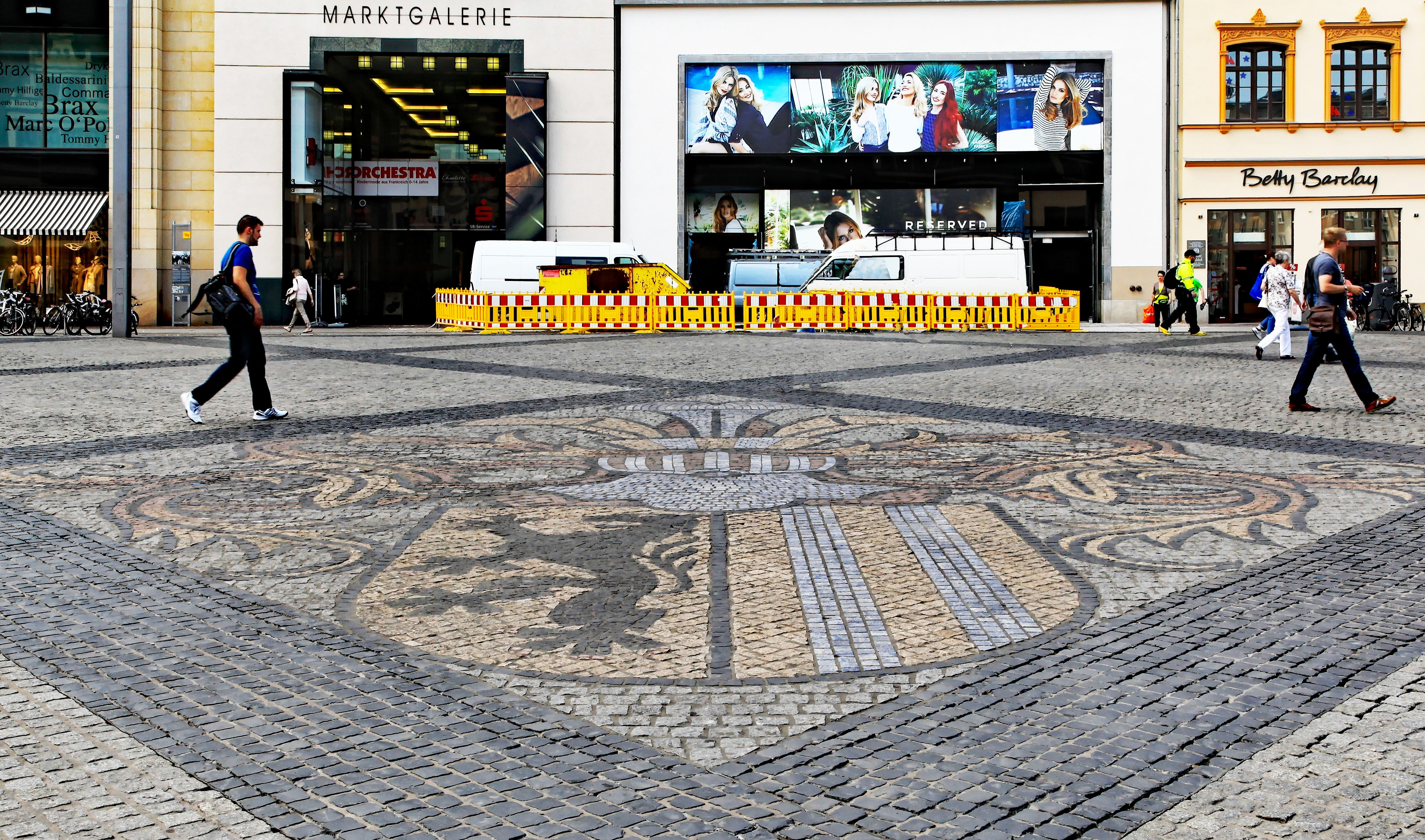
Pavement with the coat of arms of Leipzig

The square is paved in granite with a diamond pattern inlaid with darker stones. The average edge length of the rhombuses is about 10 m (32.8 ft), with the size of the rhombuses adapting to the different widths of the square. The coat of arms of Leipzig is inlaid in colored stones in the central diamond at the level of the town hall tower. Cobbled driveways named Markt run along the sides of the square which is a pedestrian zone.

The only structures on the square are the entrances to the Leipzig Markt underground railway station located under the square. In front of the escalator part, the southern access leads from the square level first via the restored staircase of the former underground exhibition hall clad with Rochlitz porphyry. On the side facing the square, this bears a bronze relief by Frank Ruddigkeit (b. 1939) on the history of the square. On the north side of the market, the escalators reach square level and there is a passenger elevator.

== History ==
The first market square of the Slavic settlement Lipsk was further north, at the intersection of the Via Regia and the Via Imperii, in the area of what is now Richard-Wagner-Platz. After Leipzig was incorporated into the Holy Roman Empire, the market was moved to its current location.

From then on it became the center of public life. Most of the goods handled by the Leipzig Trade Fair arrived here before being sold. At the end of the 19th century the Leipzig Trade Fair was transformed into a commercial samples fair and more than 20 exhibition palaces were created in the inner city, separate from the technical fairgrounds. Between 1925 and 2005, an underground exhibition hall was located under the square.

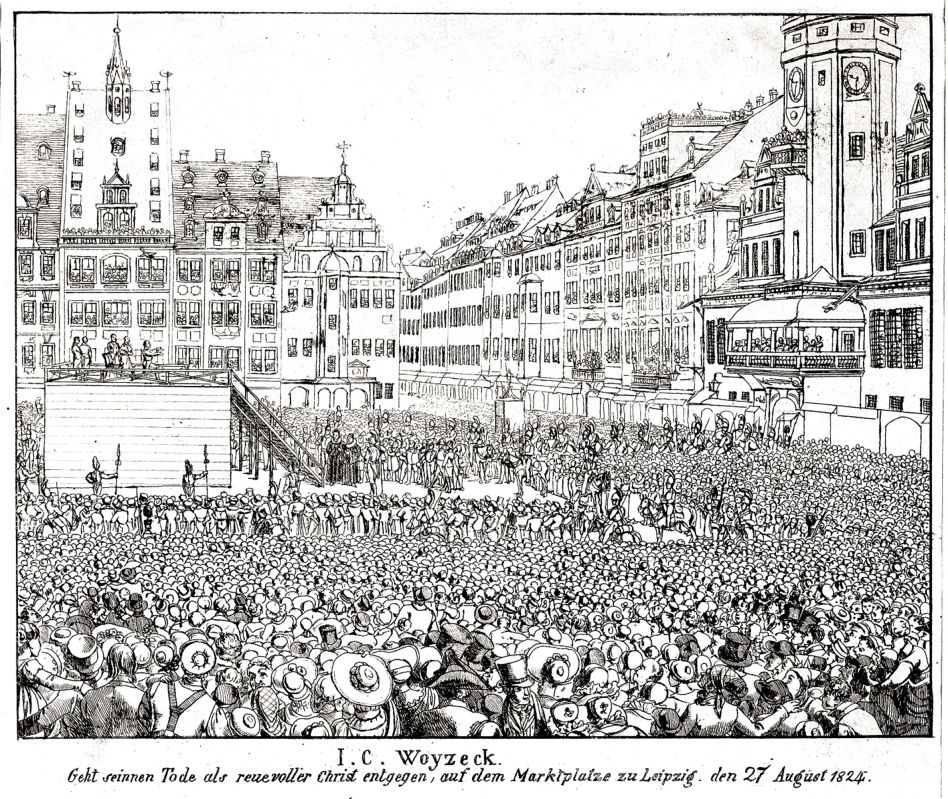
Execution of Johann Christian Woyzeck (1824)

Before 1500, twelve medieval tournaments and other cultural events took place on the market. Several houses were built in the 16th century, such as Hommels Hof, Baarmanns Hof and Eckoldsches Haus, where the lawyer and philosopher Christian Thomasius was born in 1655. In addition to the Königshaus (lit.: Kings' House), which still exists, the impressive Baroque buildings were the Jöchers Haus (built in 1707), Stieglitzens Hof (built in 1733), Aeckerleins Hof (built in 1714) and Kochs Hof (built in 1735).

The market was also a place where all public events were celebrated. According to city council sources, executions had been carried out on the market square since 1525. On 1 June 1593, four perpetrators of the Leipzig Calvinist storm were beheaded on the square. The last execution took place in the city in 1824, striking Johann Christian Woyzeck who had stabbed his mistress out of jealousy.

== Development ==
To the east, the square is flanked by the Old Town Hall, built in 1556. It is the oldest surviving structure on the site. Its arcades made of stone were added in 1909. The historic buildings on the north side were rebuilt after the war, including the historic Alte Waage. In addition to the preserved buildings, the Königshaus and the Barthels Hof, new buildings and renovations from recent years dominate the southern side and the southern part of the western flank, which are intended to recall the silhouettes of the historic buildings.

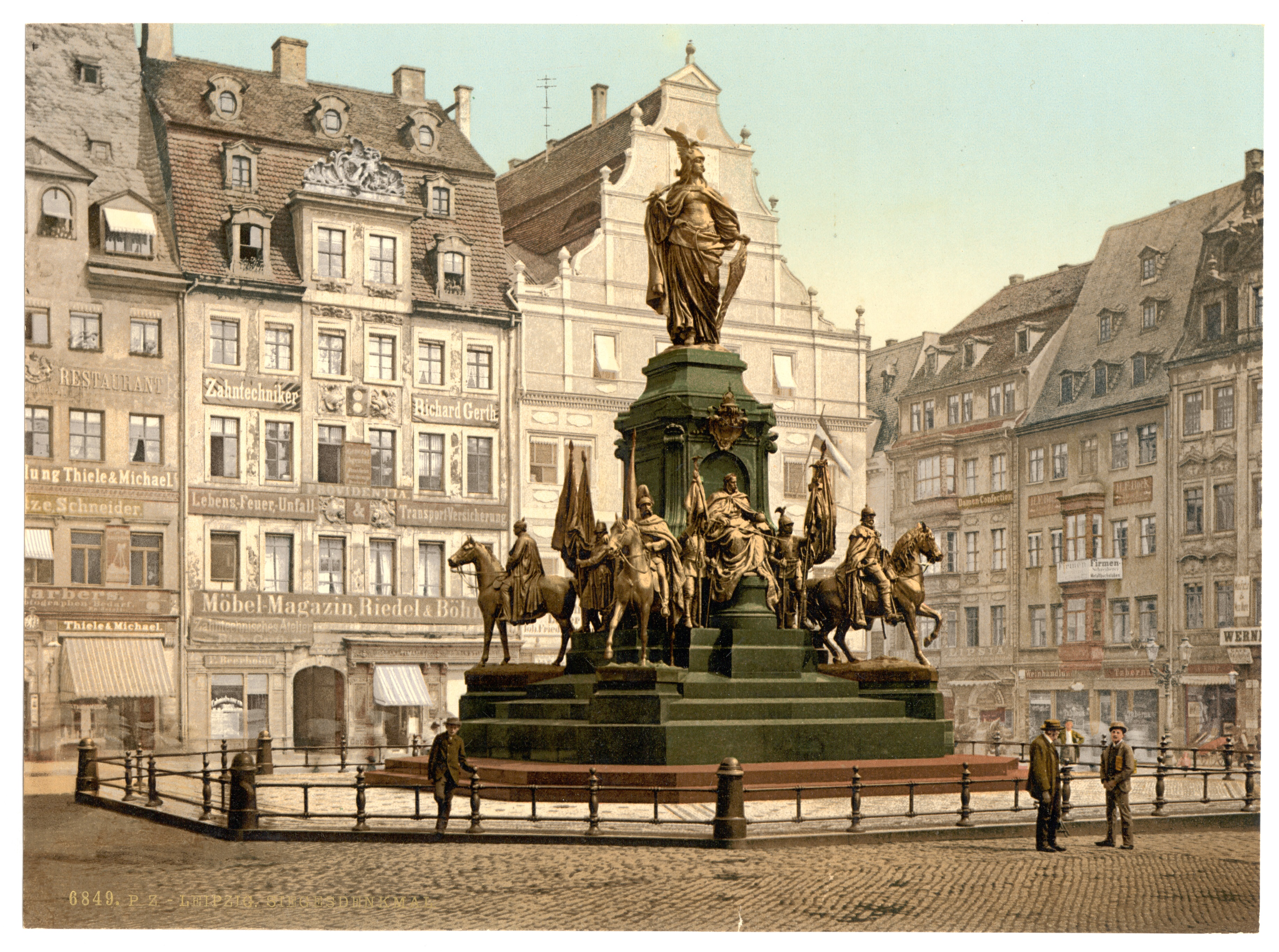
Leipzig Victory Monument 1900

Since 1581, the square had the Renaissance-style golden fountain in the northeast corner, which was demolished in 1826. The Victory Monument had stood in the northern half of the square since 1888. It was designed by Rudolf Siemering and commemorated the Franco-Prussian War of 1870/1871. It survived World War II, but not the broad rejection of Wilhelminian patriotism after 1945. By decision of the city council, it was removed in December 1946.

== Usage ==
The Leipzig Christmas Market, one of the most traditional in Germany, takes place every year on the market square. The street markets, the Easter market with the medieval market and the Bachfest Leipzig are also held here every year. From 1995 to 2017, the multi-day Classic Open organized by Peter Degner (1954–2020) took place annually. It was a combination of gastronomy and classical music, partly live, partly from tape. The follow-up event is called Leipziger Markt Musik.

At the demonstration against right-wing extremism on 21 January 2024, for which 5,000 participants were registered, the marketplace turned out to be far too small for the 60,000 participants

== Public transport ==
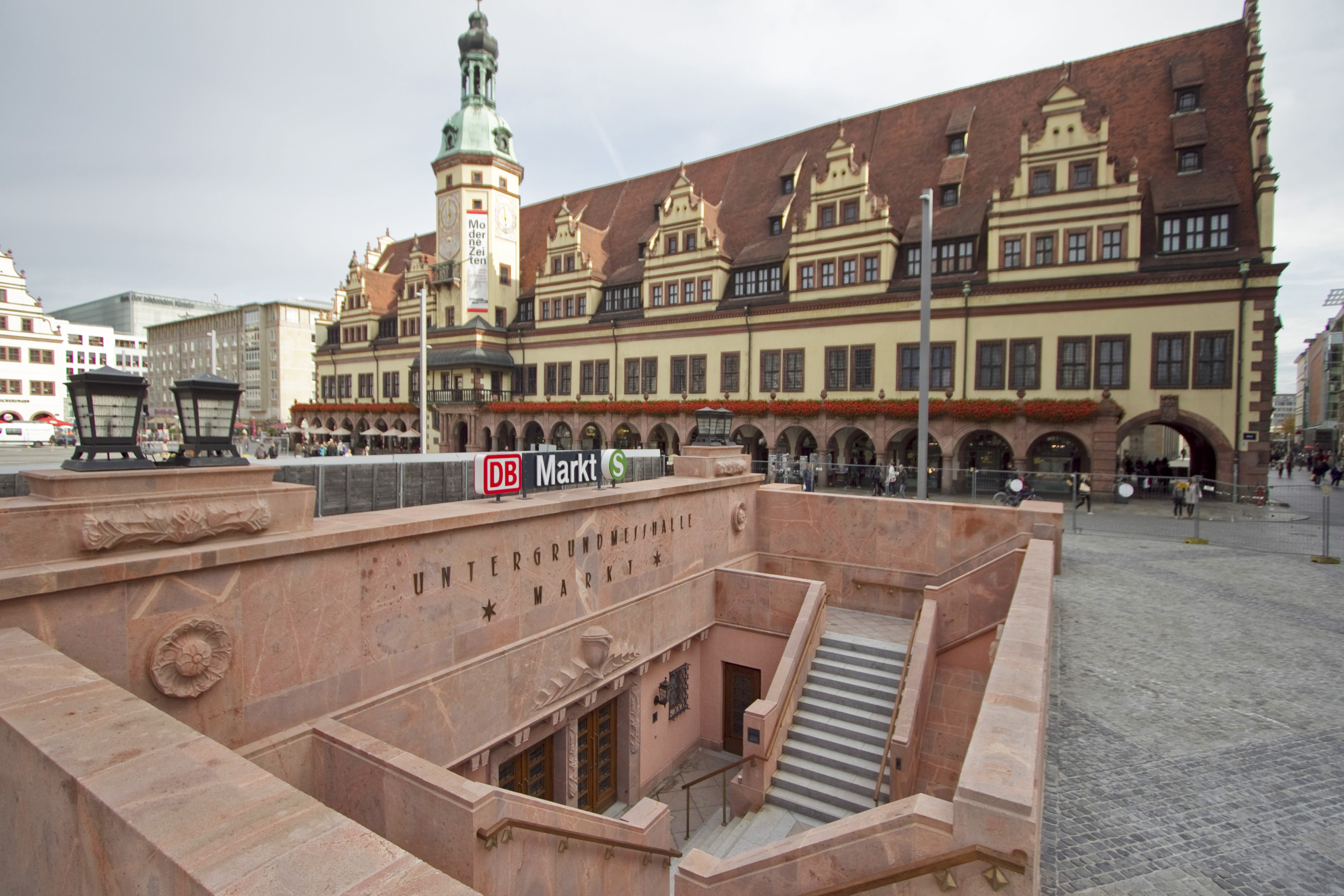
Southern S-Bahn entrance with the Old Town Hall in the background (2013)

In 1896 the market was connected to the tram network. On the south side, a two-track line led from St. Thomas Church to Augustusplatz. Lines 6 and 7 ran on this route until 1951. A second connection, coming from Katharinenstrasse, ran directly along the town hall on a single track, most recently with lines 1 and 21. It was downgraded to a non-revenue track in 1936 and closed in 1951. Since 1999, bus line 89 has a stop on the south side of the market. Since the inauguration of the Leipzig City Tunnel in 2013, the Markt can also be reached directly from numerous locations in the surrounding area via the Leipzig Markt station.

== See also ==
- Saxon Renaissance
- List of arcade galleries in Leipzig
- Barfußgäßchen
