= Natural History Museum, Leipzig =

Museum in Germany

Coordinates: 51°20′41.71″N 12°22′15.10″E

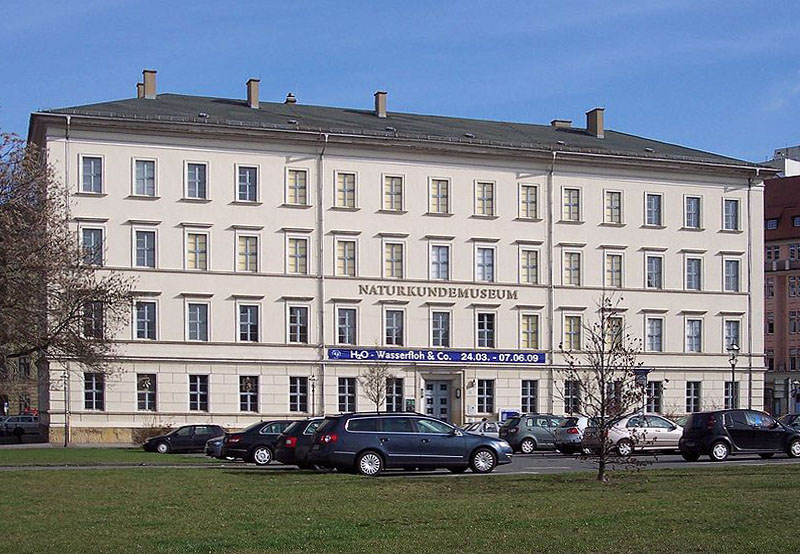
Naturkundemuseum Leipzig

Natural History Museum, Leipzig

The Natural History Museum in Leipzig (German: Naturkundemuseum Leipzig) is a natural history museum in the city of Leipzig, Germany, located at the northwest corner of the Inner City Ring Road in the locality Zentrum-Nordwest. The museum contains the insect collection of Alexander Julius Reichert.

In 2014 and in 2020, the city council decided that the Natural History Museum would be set up in the former Bowling Club.

== See also ==
- List of museums in Germany
- List of natural history museums
