= Richard-Wagner-Platz (Leipzig) =

Square in Leipzig, Germany

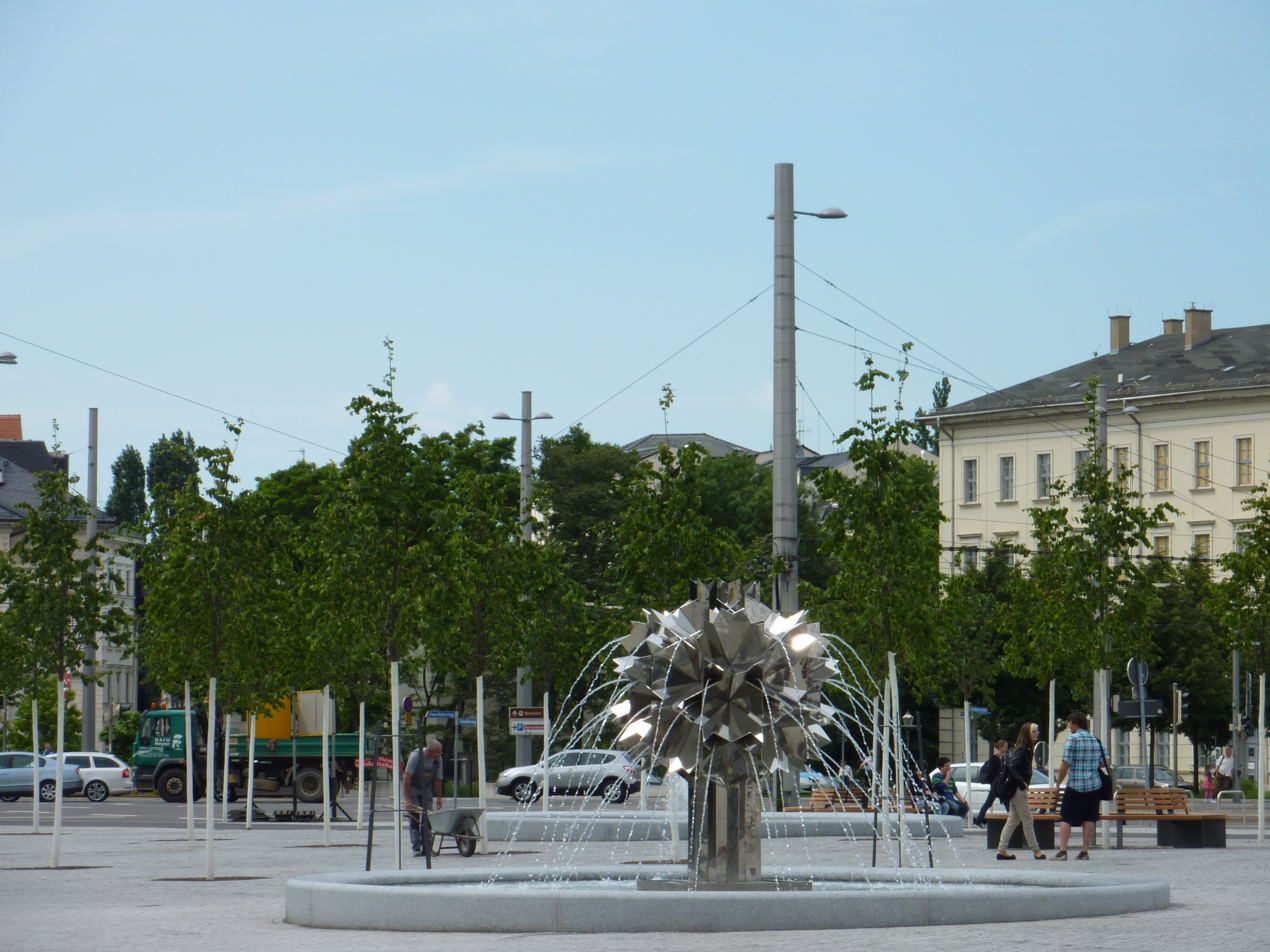
- The square with a fountain by Harry Müller
- Interactive map of Richard-Wagner-Platz
- Location: Leipzig-Mitte, Leipzig, Germany
- Postal code: 04109
- Coordinates: 51°20′35.98″N 12°22′20.02″E

Richard-Wagner-Platz is a square in Leipzig in the northwest of Leipzig city centre within Leipzig's "ring road" on the northwest corner. The square is named after the composer Richard Wagner, whose house of birth was nearby.

== New design since 2013 ==
From April 2012 to May 2013, the 7,200 m^{2} (78,000 sq ft) large Richard-Wagner-Platz, which was then used as a parking lot, was redesigned after a design competition at a cost of 2.6 million euros. It was presented to the public on the eve of Wagner's 200th birthday. On the same occasion, the Leipzig Richard Wagner Memorial was unveiled about 150 m (490 ft) southwest of Richard-Wagner-Platz in the green area at Goerdelerring.

Since that redesigning, the Richard-Wagner-Platz is covered by small granite paving. There are 59 young winter linden trees in a square grid 6 m (20 ft) wide, with a fountain in the middle. Some of the linden trees are surrounded by ring-shaped benches. There is a small skatepark southeast of the linden trees. The three art fountains designed by Harry Müller were set up in the open area of the square. They stood on the former Sachsenplatz until 1999 and are called “dandelions” by the people of Leipzig.

== History ==
On the site of today's Richard-Wagner-Platz, the first Slavic market (later called Eselsmarkt, which means donkey market) and the Slavic settlement of Lipsk, from which the city of Leipzig later developed, were probably formed in the 7th century. This market place is older than today's Leipzig's market square. In the 10th century, the place lay at the crossing of the Via Regia coming from Merseburg and leading further to Meissen to the Via Imperii, an imperial road, later Hainstrasse. At the southern end of the eastern side of the square begins the Brühl, an old street which later became the world center for fur trade practised by mostly Jewish merchants. The Hainstraße ends at the corner of Brühl. South of it begins the Große Fleischergasse, which is why the square was formerly called Fleischerplatz.

At the western end of the southwest side the Töpferstraße began. Until 1822 the square was bordered to the north and west by the Ranstädt Gate. It was one of the four city gates of Leipzig and formed the city exit to the west. With the demolition of the city wall, the square visually enlarged to the west. In the north, the square remained limited by the Altes Theater, also the Komödienhaus, built in 1766 on the foundations of the Ranstädter Bastei. After 1839 the square was called Theaterplatz.

The Lindenau tram line (first a horse-drawn railway, later a tram) crossed the square diagonally from 22 July 1882, crossing the tracks of the Ring tram line coming from the Brühl and turning into the Ranstädter Steinweg. The line was closed on 20 July 1964.

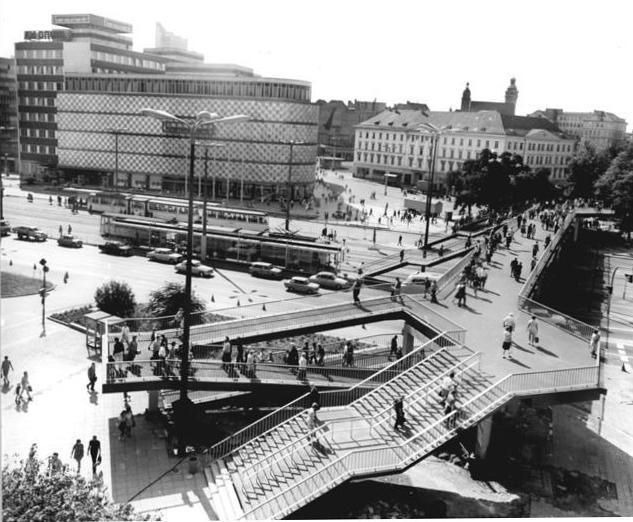
Friedrich-Engels-Platz with the pedestrian bridge in 1973.

On 22 May 1913, the 100th birthday of composer and conductor Richard Wagner, born in Brühl 1, Theaterplatz was renamed Richard-Wagner-Platz. Wagner's birthplace was on the corner of Brühl/Theaterplatz. It was demolished in 1886 and the Brühl department store was later built on this site. (Today: Höfe am Brühl shopping mall)

During the Second World War, on the night of December 3-4, 1943, a British air raid destroyed many surrounding buildings, including the Altes Theater. As a result, the square visually expanded to become the Ring-Messehaus.

On 24 August 1973, a pedestrian overpass over the square to the Ring-Messehaus was opened. The 360-ton bridge had a total length of 78 m (256 ft) and connected the Dr.-Kurt-Fischer-Straße (since then Pfaffendorfer Straße) with the Brühl. At peak times, the overpass had to accommodate over 6,000 people per hour. The bridge was demolished in 2004.

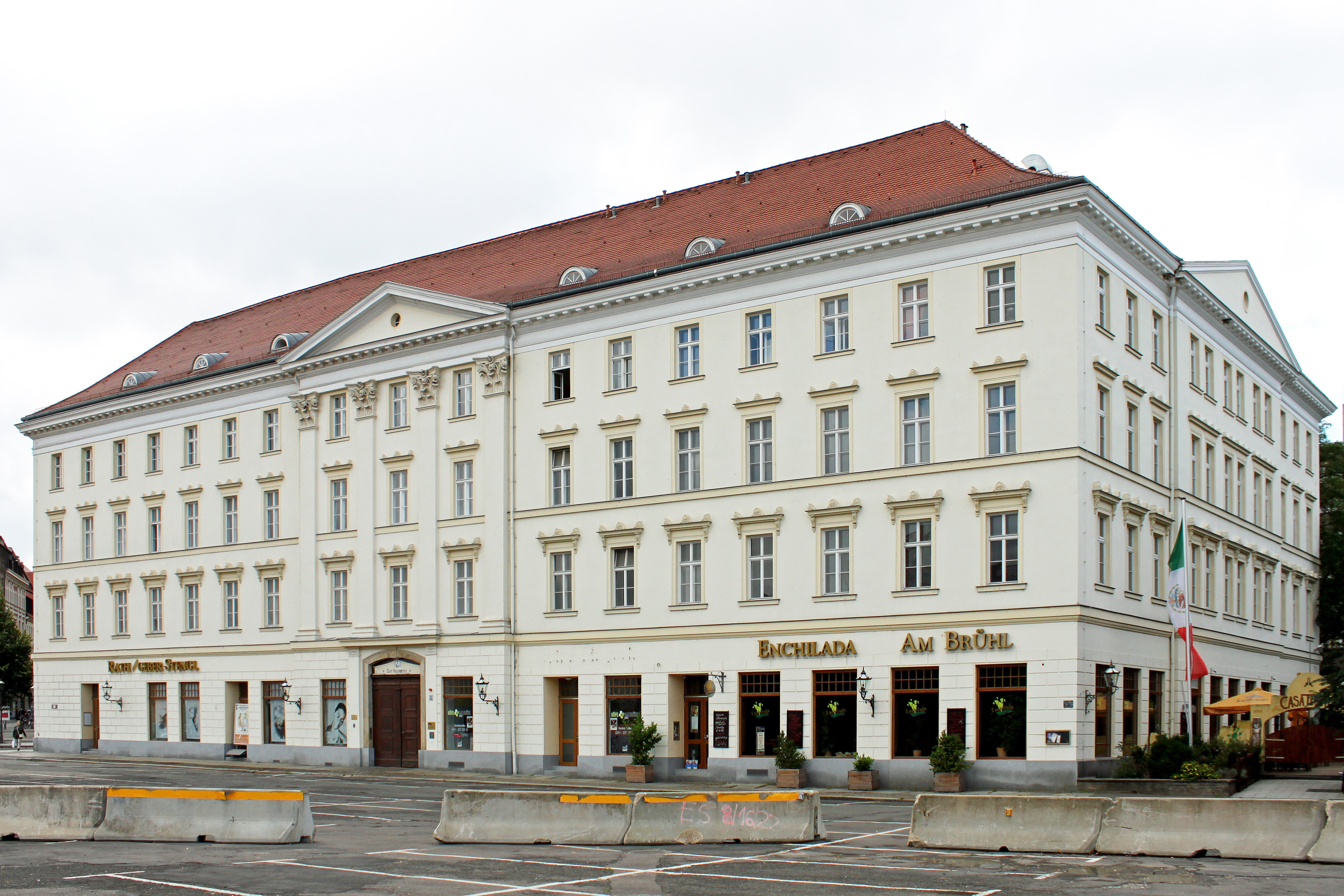
The Großer Blumenberg building.

The square is separated in its irregular form from the Goerdelerring and the Tröndlinring in the northwest by a narrow green area. Inside is the Hahneman Monument. The neo-classical building Großer Blumenberg borders the square to the south. The Brühl, the Hainstraße and the Große Fleischergasse border the square in the southeast.

== Present age ==
Due to the fact that the square was regularly the venue for meetings of the Leipzig Pegida subsidiary Legida, a petition was initiated by opposing interest groups at the end of 2015 to rename the square again as "Refugees Welcome-Platz". However, this initiative has not been implemented.

== Gallery ==
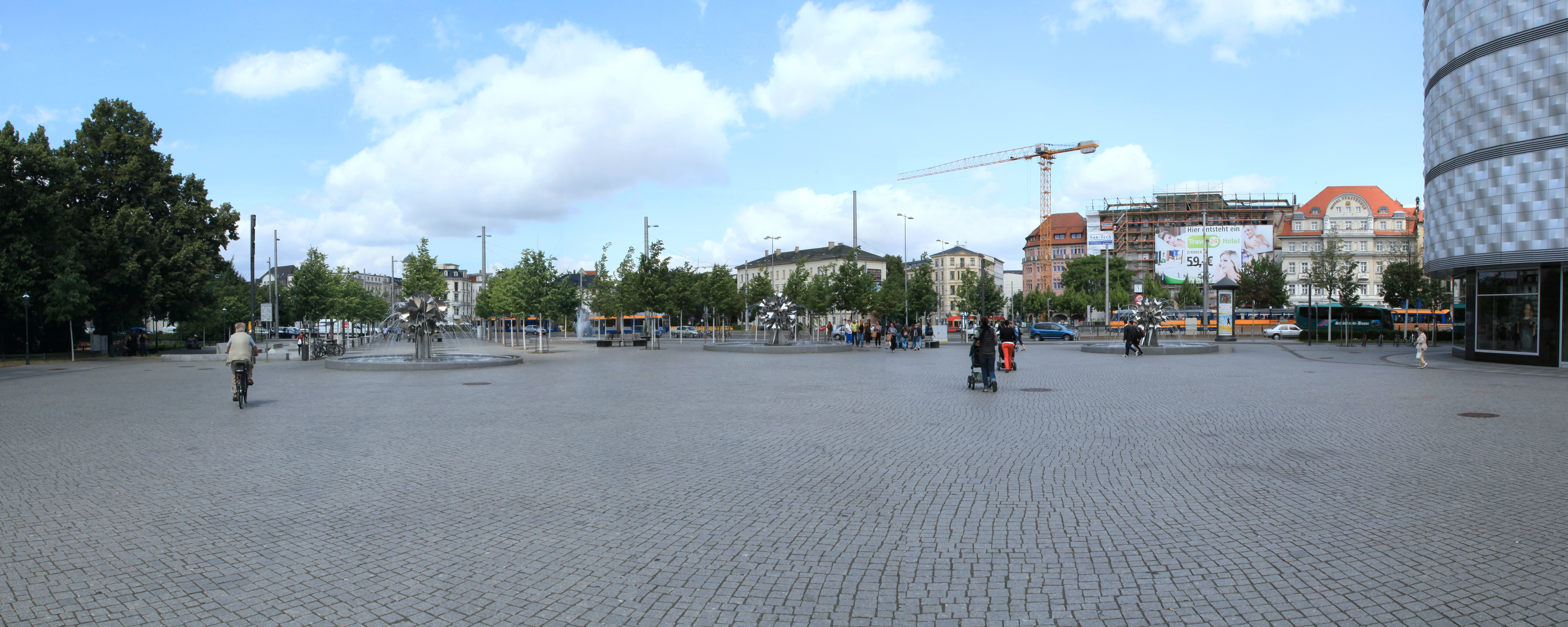

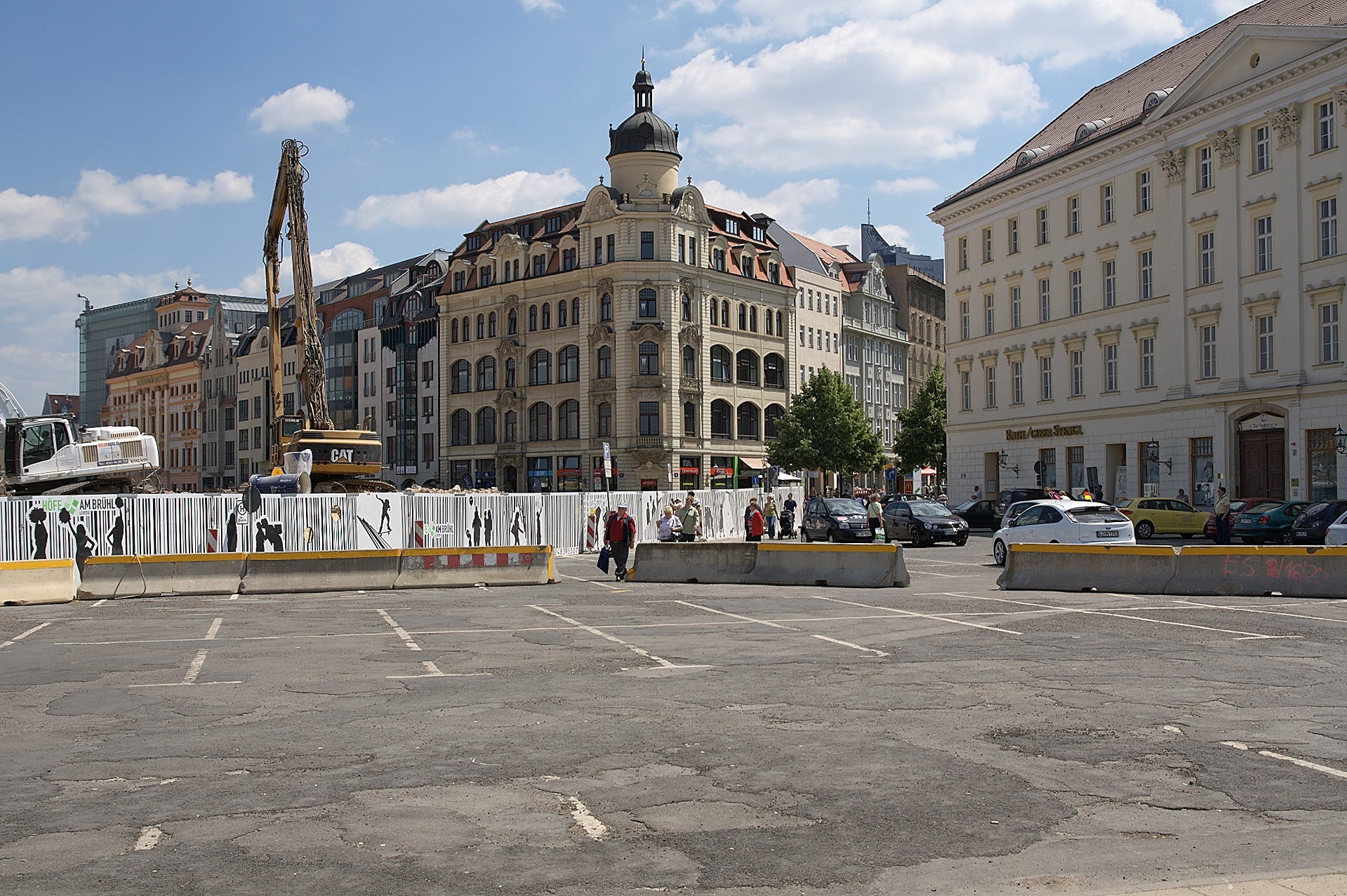

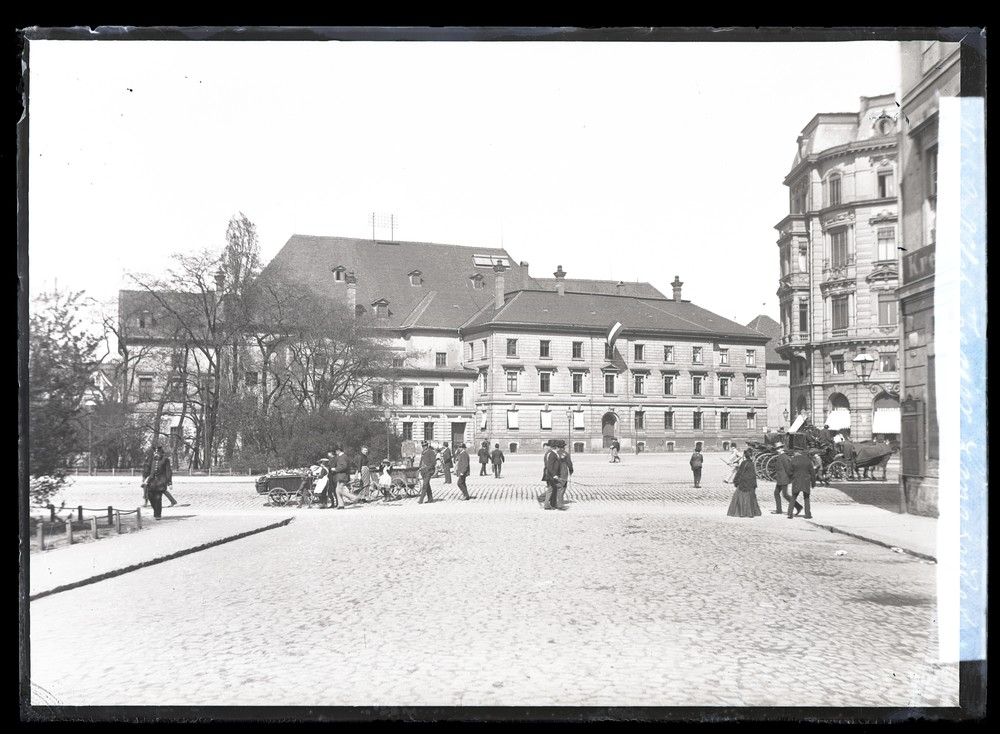

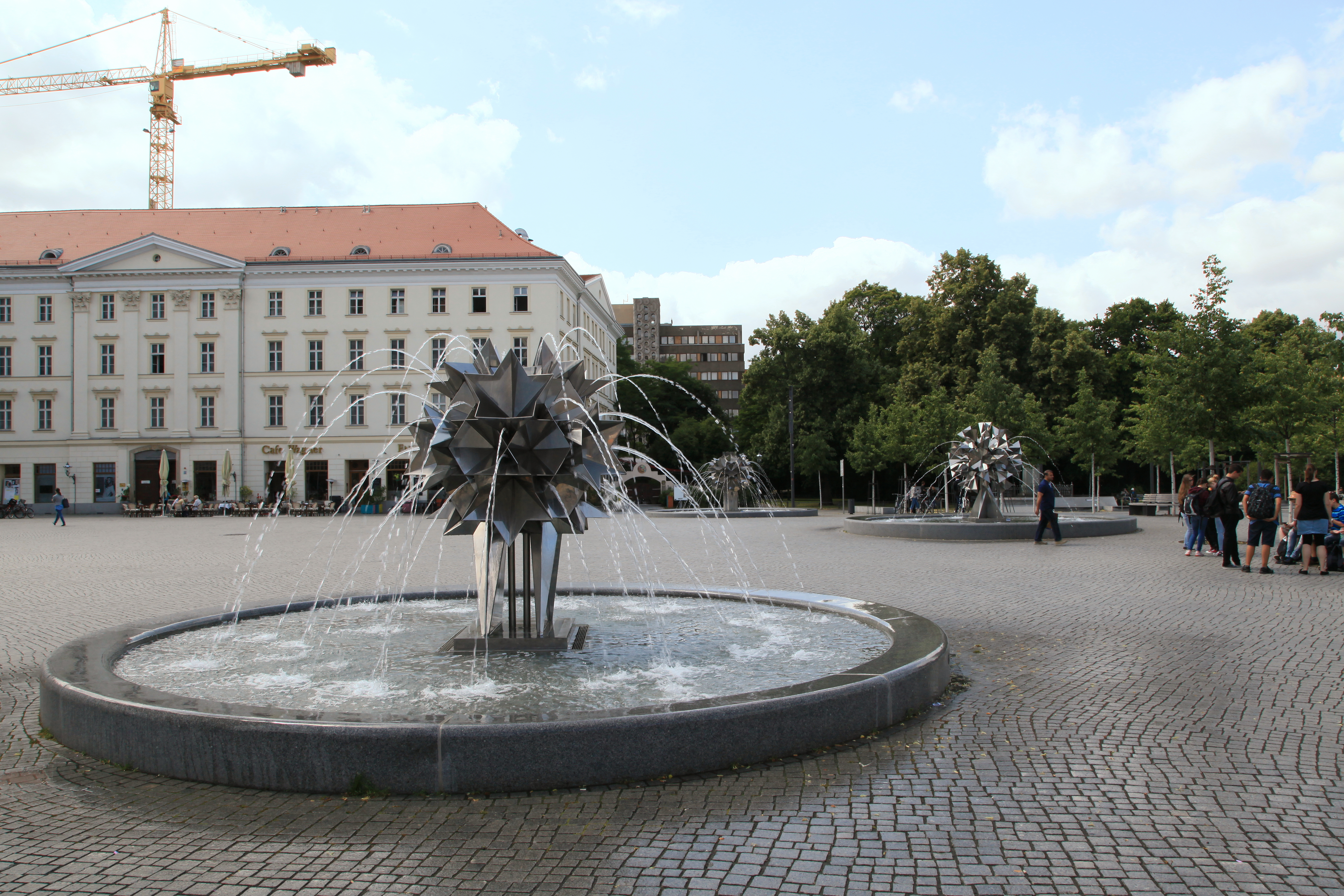

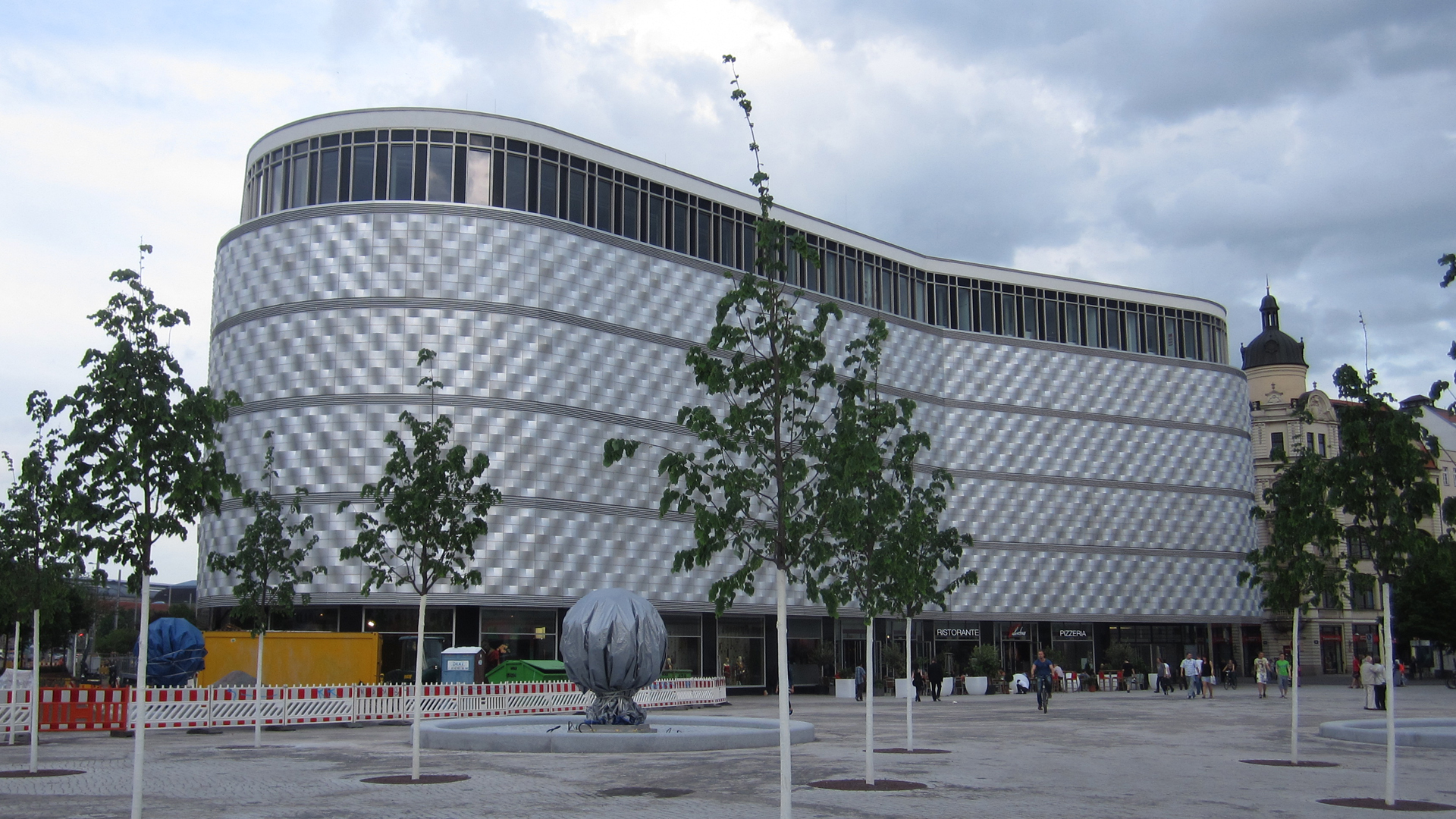

== See also ==
- List of streets and squares in Leipzig
