= Fountains in Leipzig =

Water supply system in Leipzig

The fountains in Leipzig were originally constructed as part of the city's water supply system. Additional fountains were added during the 19th and 20th centuries for decorative purposes. They are now considered to be of historical and artistic interest.

== Decorative ==
In the 1860s, the Connewitz waterworks, Leipzig's first groundwater works, was built on the Bauernwiesen (farmers' meadows). The city administration also ordered the installation of a water reservoir with a capacity of 4,000 m³ in Probstheida near Leipzig. This meant that the importance of the Leipzig fountains for supplying drinking water to the population was completely marginalized. Since then, the design purpose of the fountains has been the main focus. Of the fountains that still exist in the city today, the oldest was inaugurated in 1886 (Mendebrunnen).

=== "Badender Knabe" and "Badendes Mädchen" ===
In connection with the restoration and reconstruction work of the Old City Hall at the marketplace from 1906 until 1909, there were built two fountains „Badender Knabe“ (German: Bathing knave, Sculptor: Carl Seffner) and „Badendes Mädchen“ (German: Bathing girl). They are in a niche inside and in front of the passage on the town hall's side towards the Naschmarkt. The sculpture of the girl has been made by Johannes Hartmann in 1906. After it has been stolen, it was recreated in 2000 by the Leipzig sculptor Klaus Schwabe.

=== Löwenbrunnen ===
It is located (51°20′23.89″N 12°22′32.19″E) on the Naschmarkt opposite the main entrance of the Mädler Arcade Gallery and was built in 1918, on the location of buildings dating from 1690. Its fountain is reached by three steps that surround it and is decorated with mythical creatures and marine sandstone reliefs. On the copper painted hood, there was a pyramid, crowned at the tip with a golden sun.

Around 1820 there was a decorated pump handle in the form of an iron lion and designed by the Berlin sculptor Johann Gottfried Schadow and cast by Lauchhammer. It was incorporated into the lion fountain designed by the Leipzig Oberbaurat Hugo Licht. There is a Versalinschrift on the back of the fountain which reads "In the last war in 1918, this fountain in the shape of the old wooden housing has been rebuilt from the rate by the architect Dr. Ing. Hugo Lucht. The funds were donated by the Hugo Haschke Company."

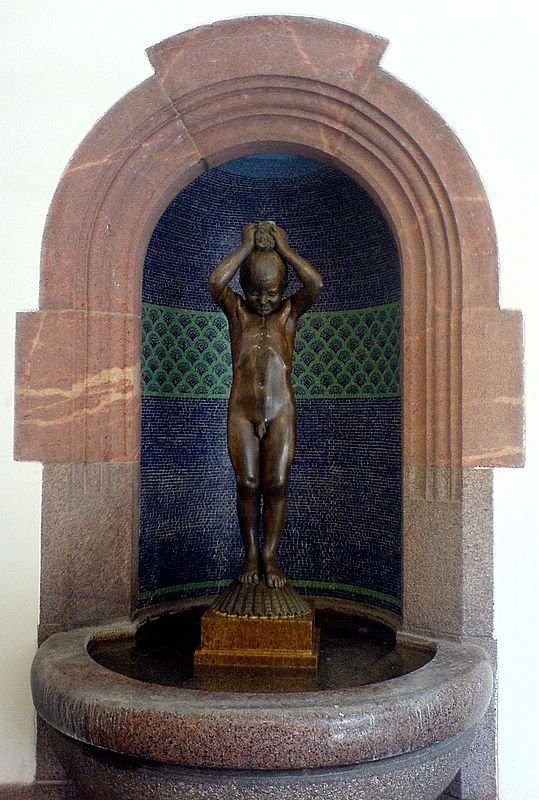
Decorative fountain Bathing knave

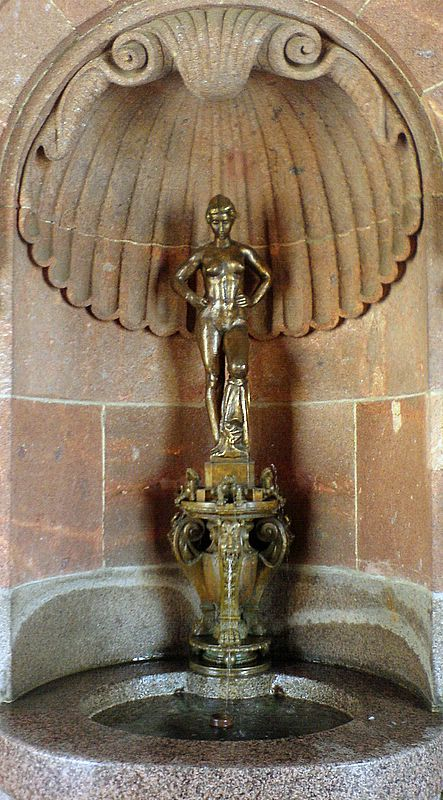
Decorative fountain Bathing girl

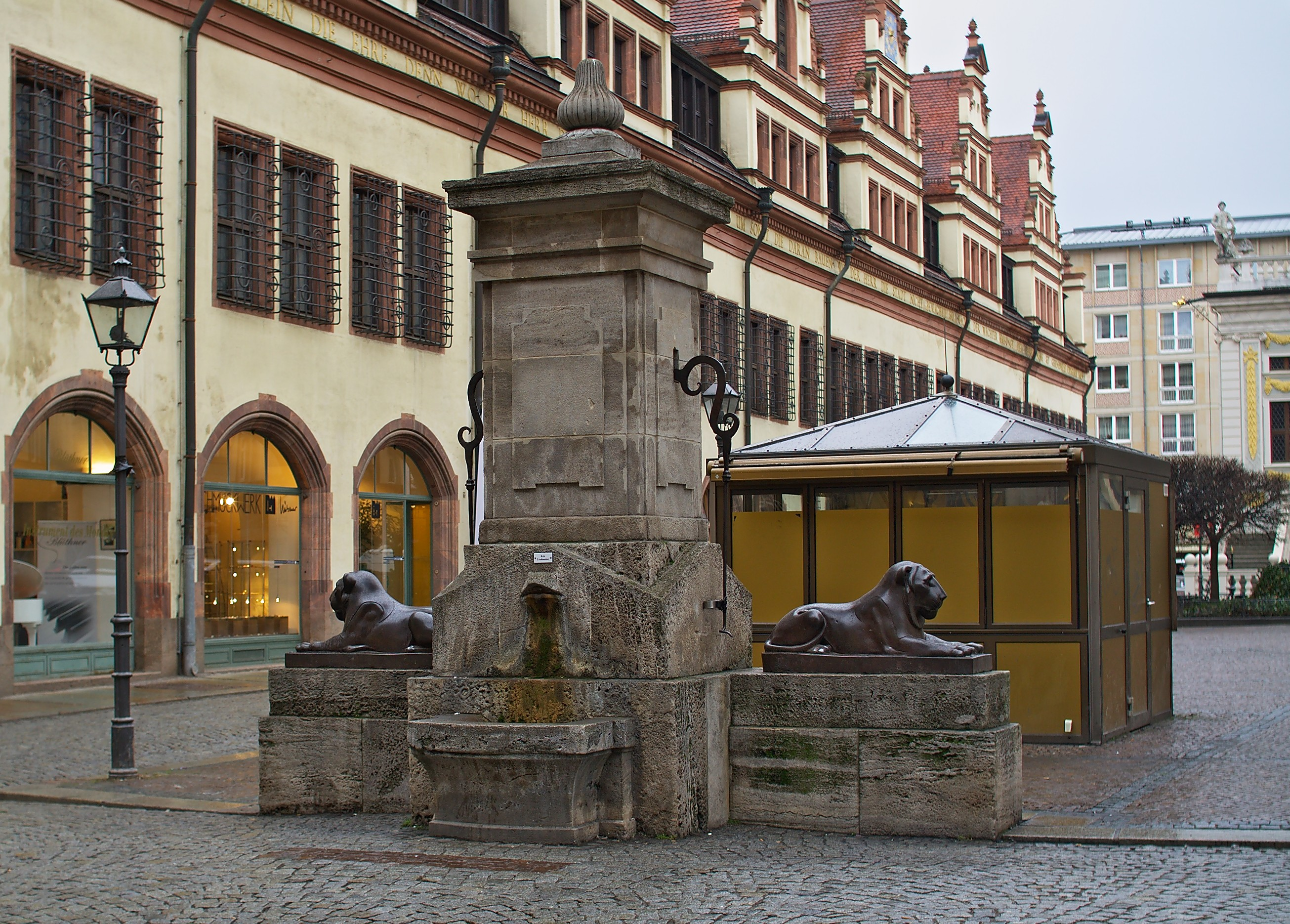
Lion Fountain (Löwenbrunnen)

=== Mägdebrunnen ===
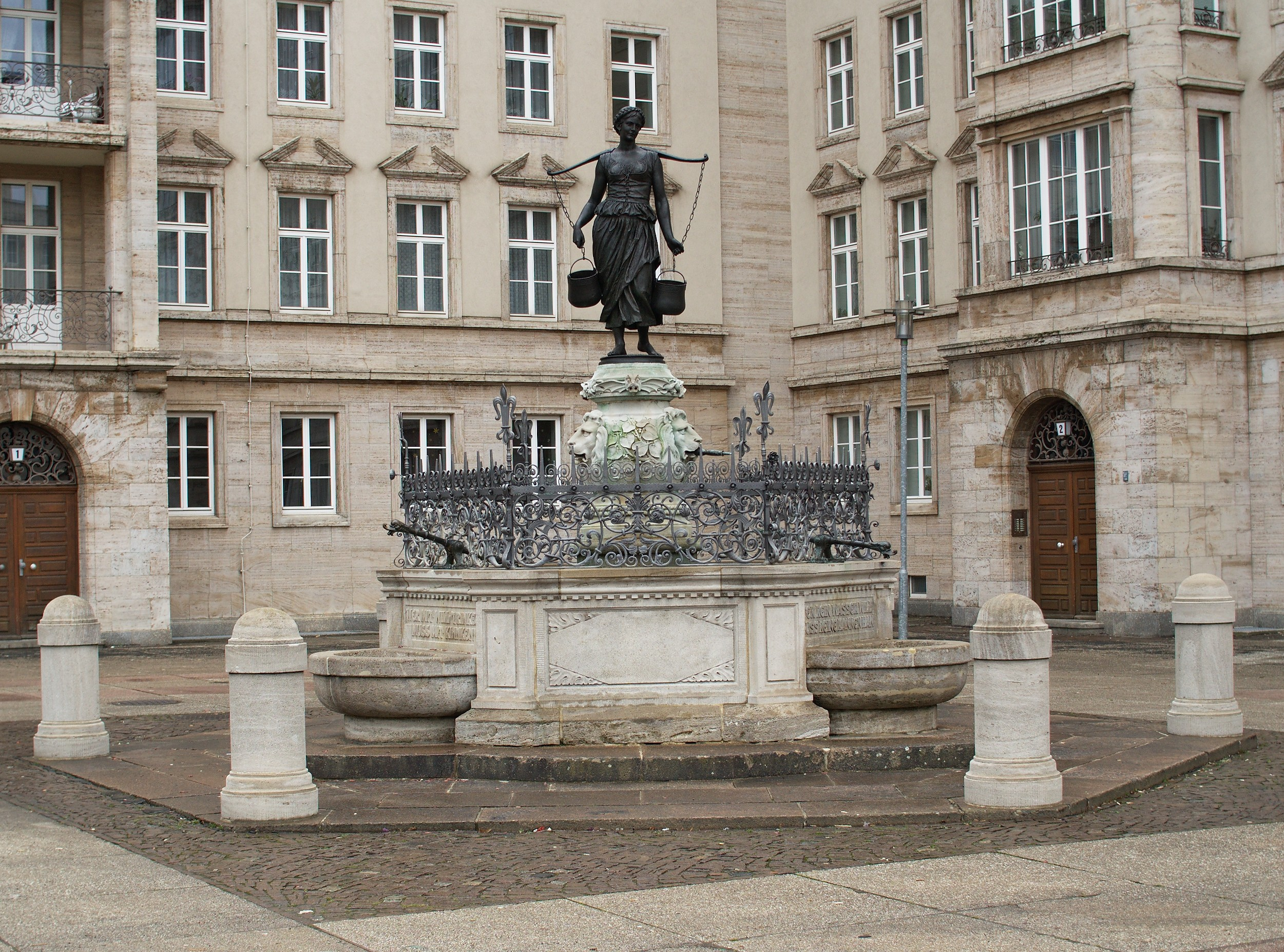
The fountain scene from Goethe's Faust: Der Mädgebrunnen

The Mägdebrunnen, which was inaugurated on 31 May 1906 and was formerly located at the confluence of Seeburgstrasse and Sternwartenstrasse with Roßplatz, is now located in the northern corner of the Ringbebauung on Roßplatz (51°20′13.55″N 12°22′54.41″E). The funds required for its construction were raised by Leipzig residents living abroad. The fountain, created by the sculptor Werner Stein, consists of a six-sided water basin made of white shell limestone, with smaller water basins in front of it on three sides. Above these are capital inscriptions (“Whoever wants pure water must use pure jugs”, “Water takes everything away, just don’t talk badly”, “Whoever wants to drink must join”).

The centerpiece of the building is the life-size bronze figure of a woman carrying water on the central column decorated with lion heads, which refers to Lieschen from the fountain scene in Johann Wolfgang von Goethe's Faust I. The Mägdebrunnen was moved around 1955 as part of the redesign of Roßplatz and was extensively renovated in 1993.

=== Märchenbrunnen ===
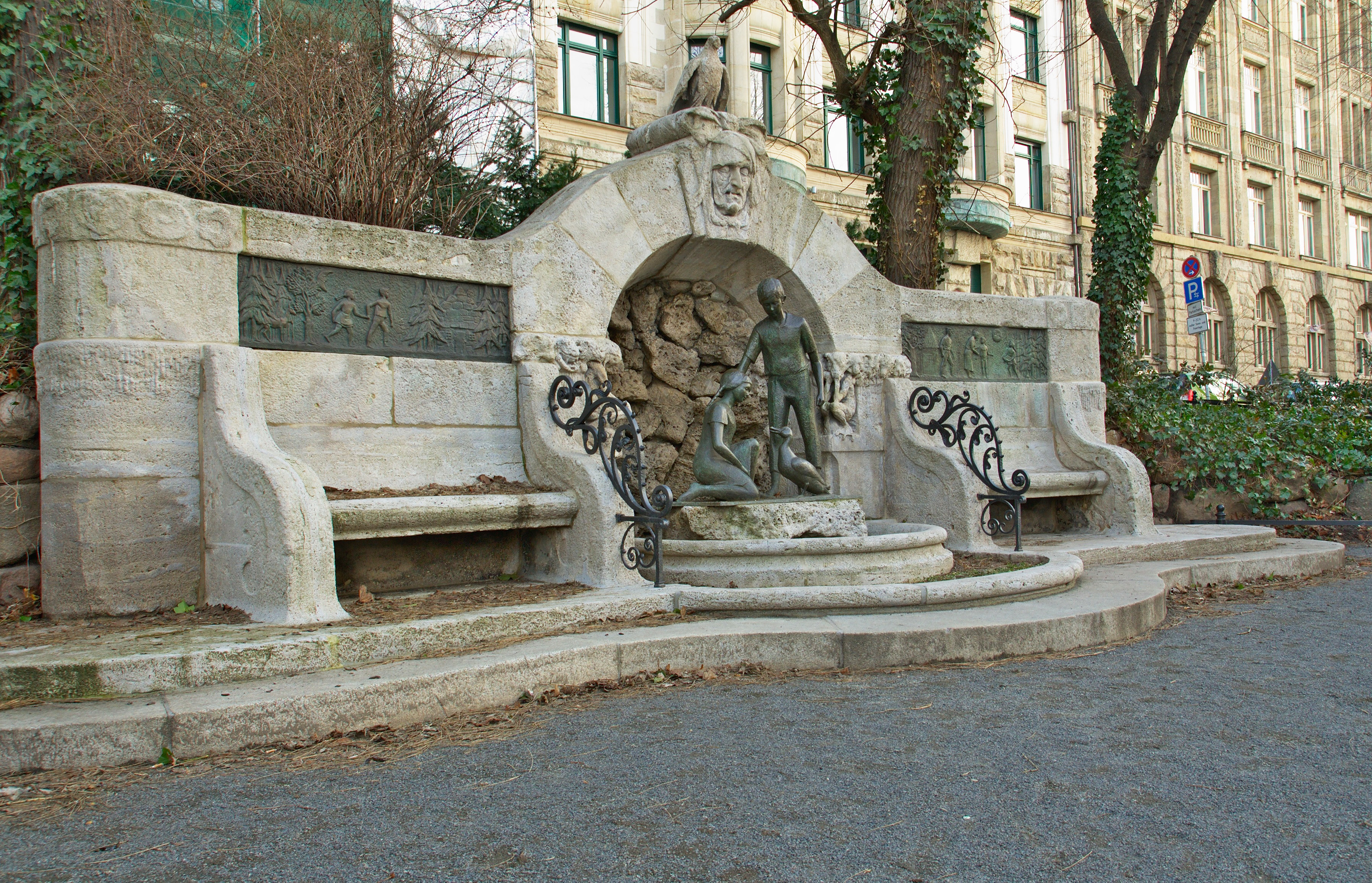
An out-of-the-way gem: The Märchenbrunnen

The Märchenbrunnen (Fairytale fountain) in the promenade at Dittrichring (51°20′4.86″N 12°22′18.12″E) was created in 1906 by Josef Mágr. In the grotto of the middle section there are life-size bronze figures of the fairy tale characters Hansel and Gretel on a pedestal. Above this is a stone relief of a witch and a raven. Above the benches on both sides of the middle section there are two bronze reliefs that depict key scenes from the fairy tale (getting lost in the forest, discovering the crispy house, returning home).

The bronze parts of the fountain were removed in 1942 and used in the armaments industry. Since 1965, the fountain has been decorated with new figures designed by the Leipzig artists Elfriede Ducke and Hanna Studnitzka.

=== Mendebrunnen ===
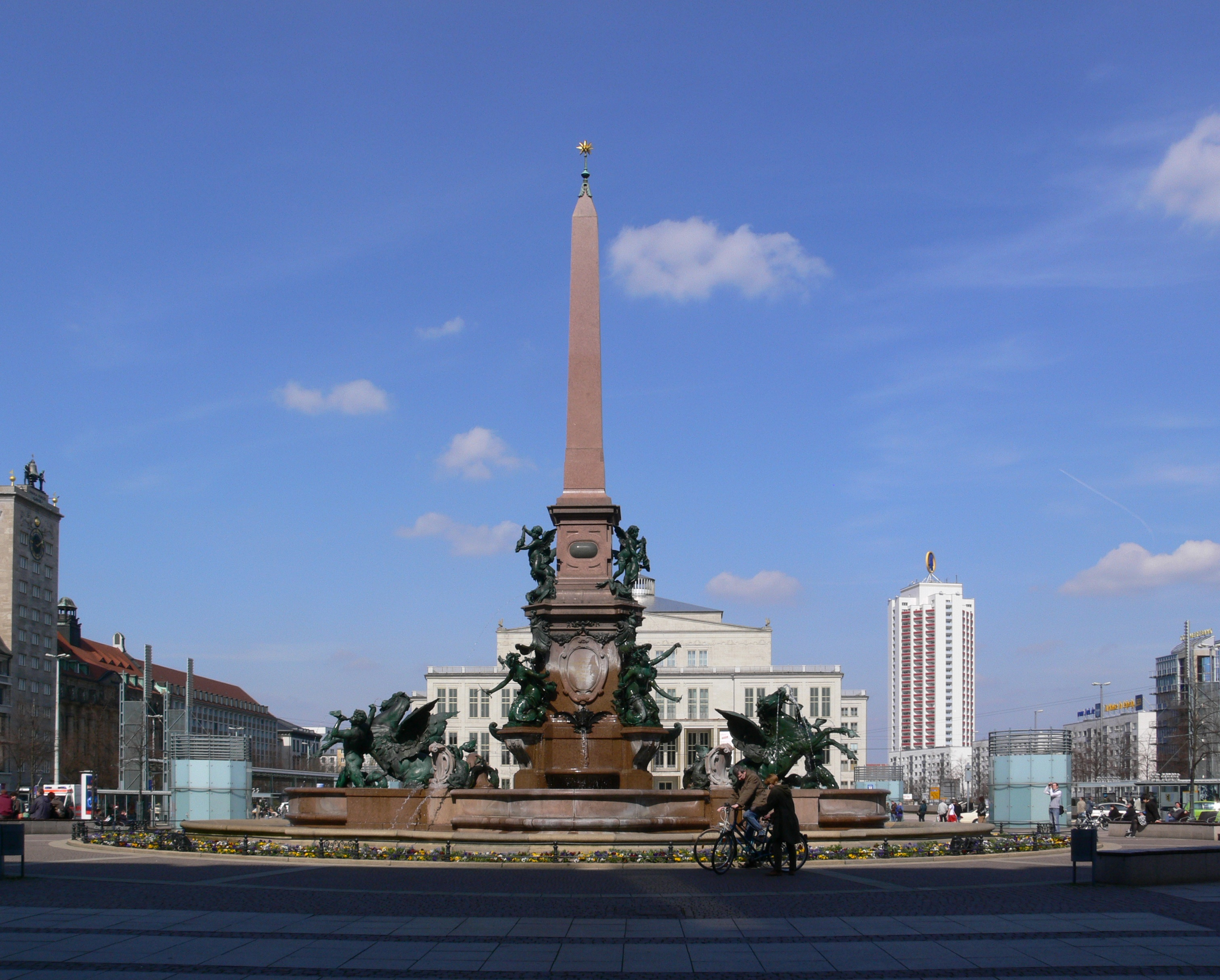
Mendebrunnen in 2010

The Mendebrunnen is located at Augustusplatz in front of the Gewandhaus (Concert Hall) (51°20′18.71″N 12°22′50.7″E). It is the largest fountain in Leipzig and cost 189,000 gold marks to construct. It was built by Adolf Gnauth in 1883–86. The ensemble of figures was created by the Munich sculptor Jacob Ungerer. Pauline Mende, a merchant's widow, bequeathed her money to Leipzig for building a fountain. In honor to her Leipzig give the fountain her name.

Regarding her motives, Egon Erwin Kisch speculated that Mende was the owner of a brothel and wanted to atone for her sacrilegious earthly actions with the generous legacy. The legend later turned out to be a (possibly intentional) mix-up.

The Mendebrunnen is to be understood as an allegory of the importance of water for humans. The maritime depictions embody figures from Greek mythology: Triton, the son of Poseidon, is depicted twice with a human torso and a double-tailed fish body. The Triton figures contain powerfully rearing hippocampi, mythical creatures half horse, half fish, which can be interpreted as man's control of the forces of the sea. The Nereids on the consoles of the almost 18 m (59.1 ft) tall obelisk symbolize the benefits that people derive from dealing with the sea. Gnauth and Ungerer based their basic concept of the fountain as well as the selection and design of the sculptures on famous models of the Italian Baroque. The references to the Roman fountains in Piazza Navona, the Fontana del Moro and the Four Rivers Fountain designed by Gian Lorenzo Bernini are unmistakable. The motif of the ensemble of figures could be inspired by Nicola Salvi's Trevi Fountain in Rome.

=== St. Nicholas Fountain ===
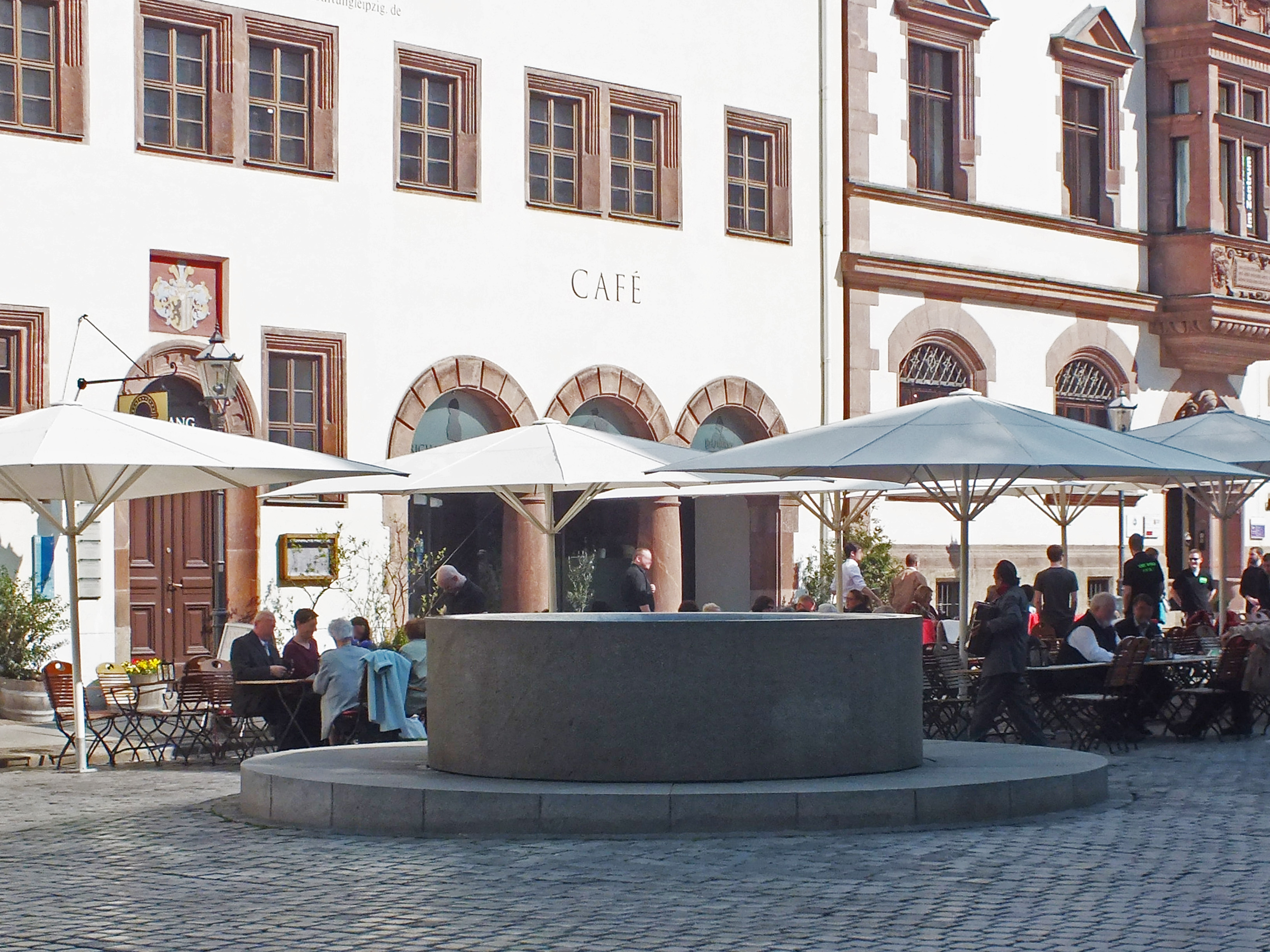
St. Nicholas Fountain (Nikolaibrunnen)

The fountain on St. Nicholas Church Square (51°20′26.1″N 12°22′43″E), in German Nikolaibrunnen, inaugurated in 2002, is also called the Chipperfield fountain. It was built as a result of a competition advertised by the city of Leipzig and the Stiftung Lebendige Stadt. The granite bowl, which is filled to the brim with water and has a diameter of 3.3 m (10.8 ft), is reminiscent of an oversized baptismal font in a church. The monolithic design by the Berlin office of David Chipperfield Architects was selected from 6 submitted works and won an award. The overflowing fountain is intended to represent the political situation in 1989, when the neighboring St. Nicholas Church became the starting point for the Monday demonstrations in Leipzig. The modern fountain's shape is subtle, especially when compared to a Renaissance predecessor on the square that no longer exists, and creates a quiet square atmosphere in the center of the city.

=== Dandelion fountain ===
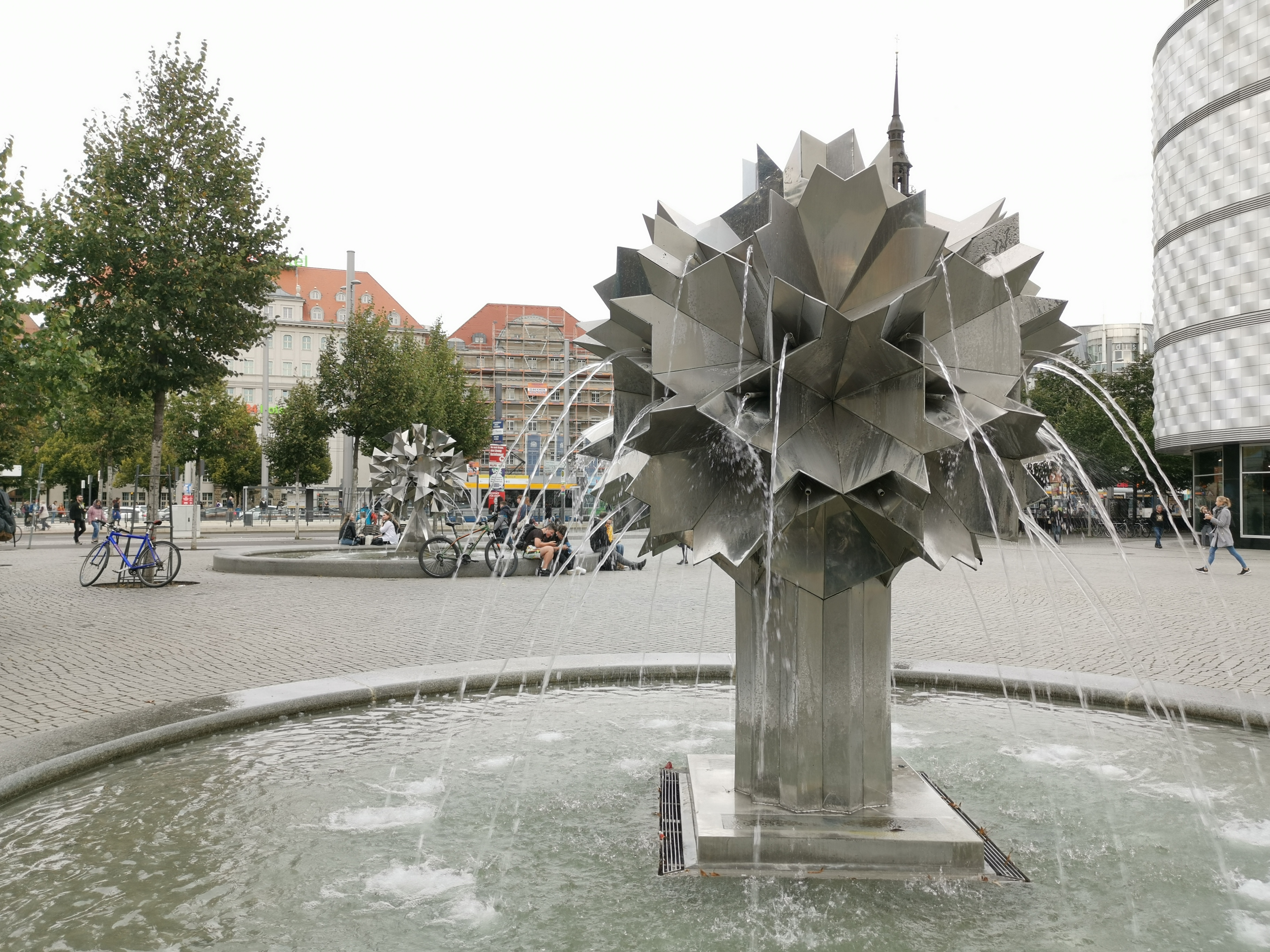
Dandelion fountain on Richard-Wagner-Platz

The name Dandelion Fountain (in German: Pusteblumenbrunnen) has become established for the three fountain sculptures made of stainless steel designed by Harry Müller (1930–2020) because their appearance is reminiscent of dandelions. They are about 3 m (9.8 ft) tall. The location of the three sculptures created in 1971–72 was originally on Sachsenplatz, which has been covered by the new Museum of Fine Arts since 2002 and the completed Leipzig Museum Quarter since 2017. The listed dandelions, which had been stored in the meantime, found their new location in 2013 (51°20′36.74″N 12°22′20.14″E) on the newly designed Richard-Wagner-Platz in front of the building popularly known as the Blechbüchse (in English: Tin can), whose curtain wall is also a listed work by Harry Müller.

=== Rathausbrunnen ===
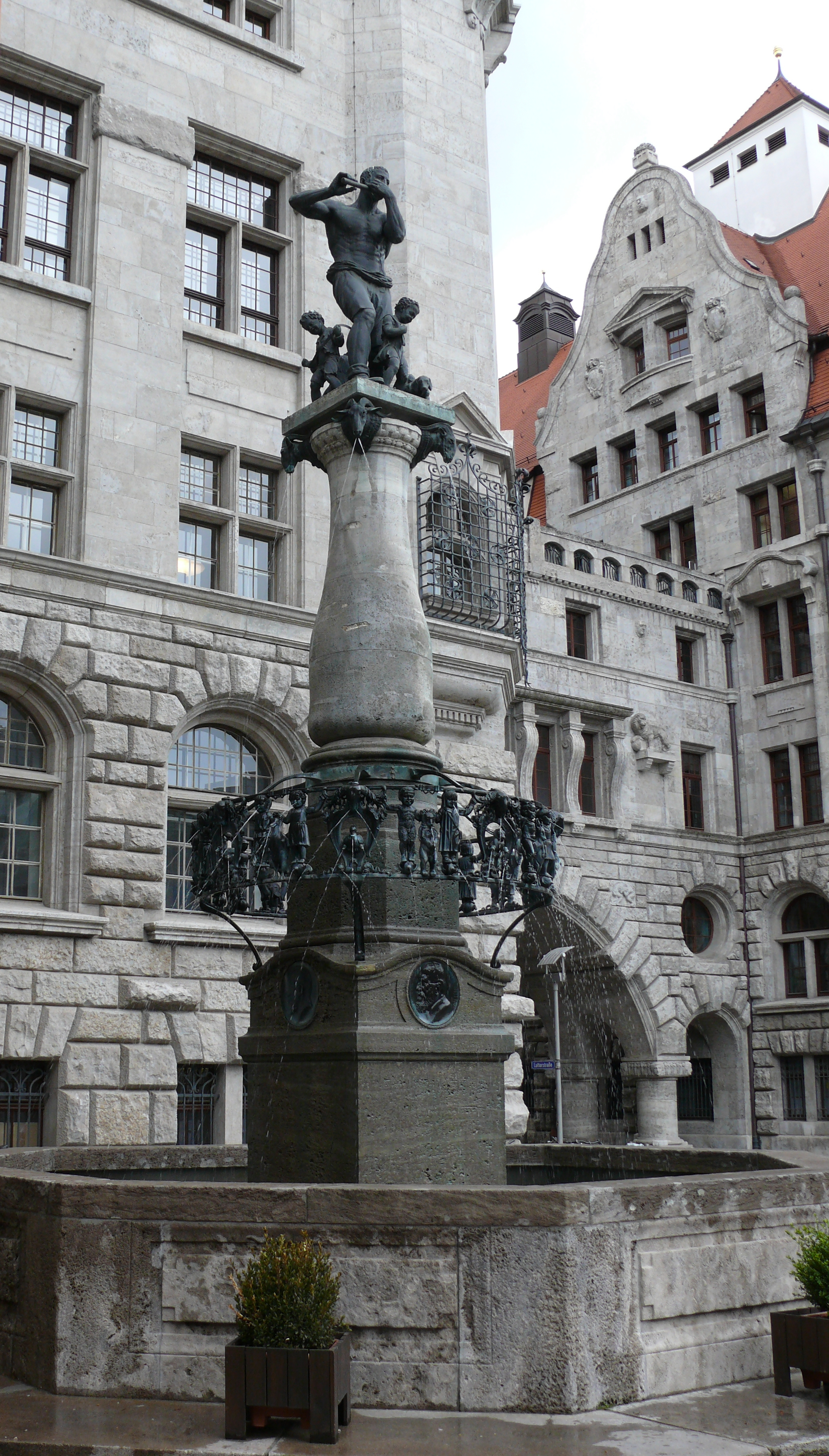
In the shadow of the New Town Hall: Rathausbrunnen

On the Burgplatz, in front of the entrance to the Ratskeller, is the Rathausbrunnen (town hall fountain) (51°20′12.26″N 12°22′22.94″E), which was opened on 7 October 1908, the third anniversary of the inauguration of the New Town Hall. Since the complete renovation was completed in 1999, the fountain has been in operation again after a five-year break.

The town hall fountain was financed by Leipzig citizens and designed by the Dresden sculptor Georg Wrba. It consists of an octagonal water basin made of shell limestone, in the middle of which there is a round column. Attached to it is the “fairy tale wreath”, which is decorated with small figures from German fairy tales. On the column stands a group of bronze figures, consisting of a life-sized youth playing the flute and two boys playing at his feet. This makes the fairy tale of the Pied Piper of Hamelin the central motif of the fountain, which is also called the “Pied Piper Fountain” for this reason.

At the base of the column there are portrait medallions of the mayors of Leipzig Otto Georgi (1831–1918) and Carl Bruno Tröndlin (1835–1908) as well as the builder of the New Town Hall Hugo Licht. A bronze plaque on the back indicates the reason for the fountain's construction: "In memory of the inauguration of the New Town Hall on 7 October 1905".

=== Villersbrunnen ===
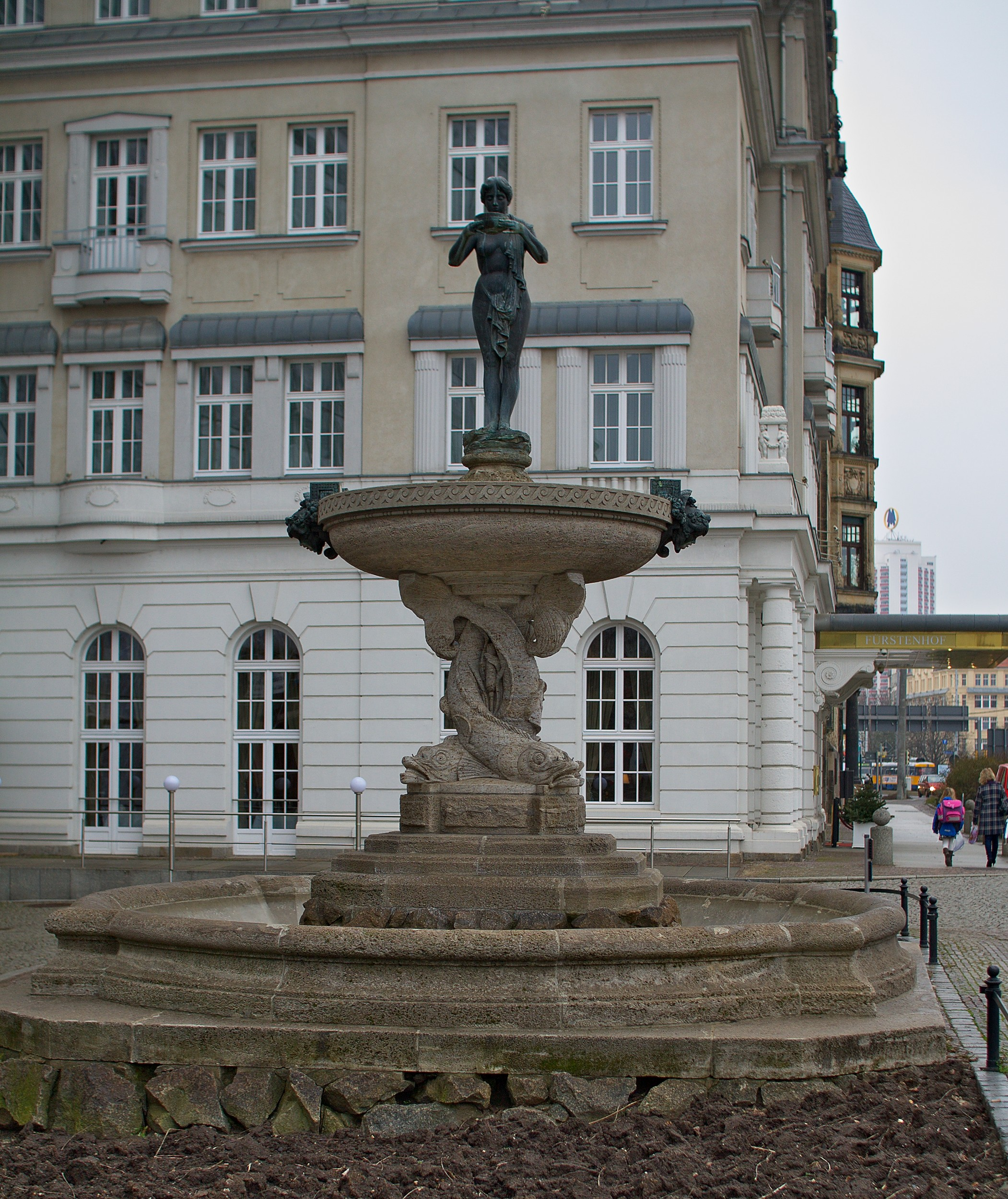
Villersbrunnen

The Villersbrunnen, located on the Tröndlinring (51°20′39.81″N 12°22′25.57″E), was built in 1903 on the initiative of the Leipzig booksellers Dürr and Geibel under the direction of the sculptor Max Unger. Helene de Villers was Dürr's wife, who died in 1854 after a short marriage. The complex, made of light stone, rests on a foundation made of rock, above which the cast base with a large, round water basin rises. This arrangement is repeated on the central column of the fountain. The upper, smaller water basin is supported by three intertwined fish bodies. On it stands a bronze figure depicting a drinking female figure. The original figure was melted down in 1942 for the production of military equipment. It was only in the 1950s that the fountain was given back its original shape with a replica of the female figure. The figure, created by the sculptor Markus Brille, was stolen in 1993 and replaced by a detailed copy in 2003.
