= Brühl (Leipzig) =

Street in Leipzig

Coordinates: 51°20′34″N 12°22′42″E

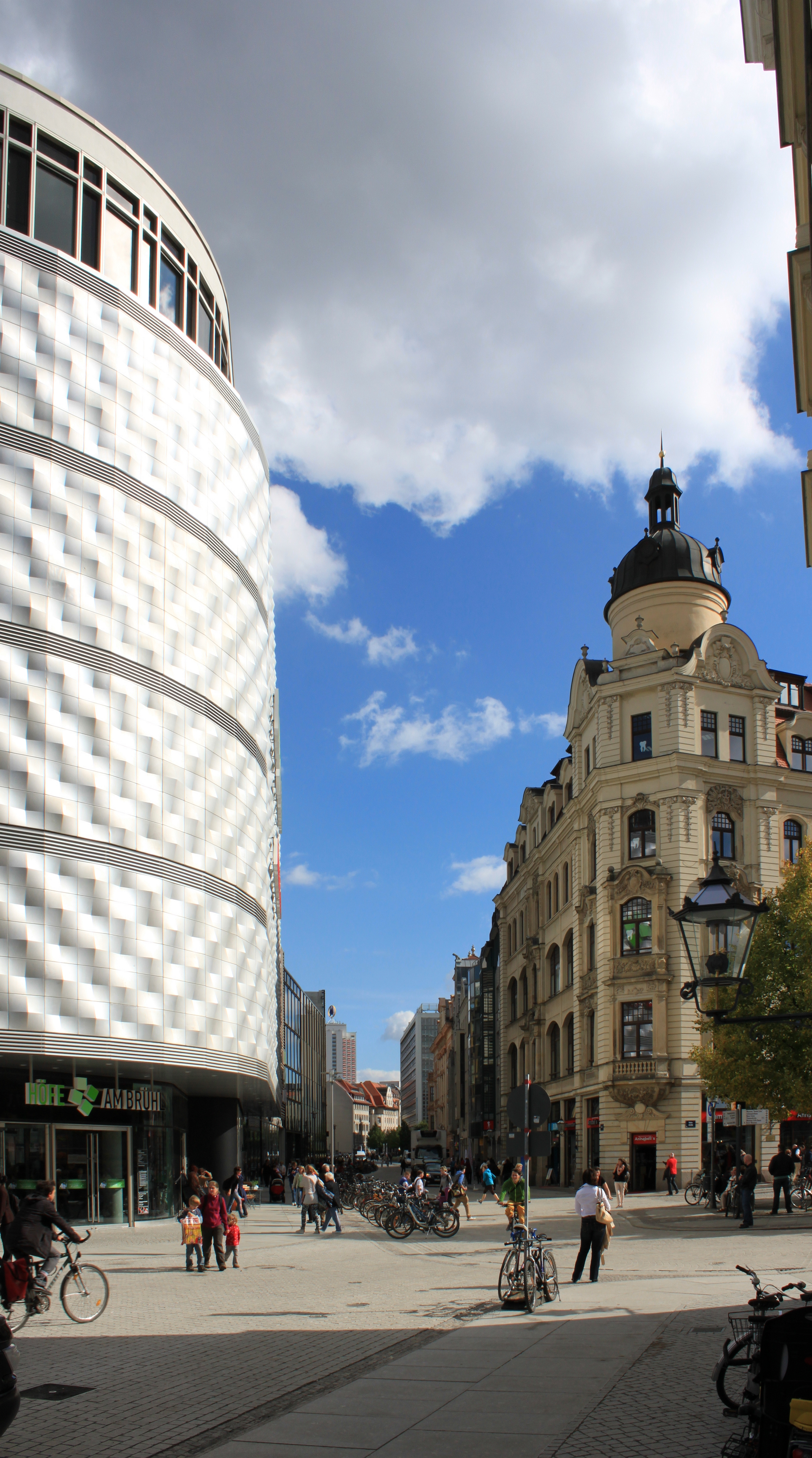
- Brühl with shopping centre Höfe am Brühl to the left
- Interactive map of Brühl
- Length: 579 m (1,900 ft)
- Location: Leipzig-Mitte, Leipzig, Germany
- Postal code: 04109
- Nearest metro station: Leipzig Hauptbahnhof and tram stop Goerdelerring
- West end: Richard-Wagner-Platz
- East end: Goethestrasse

Construction
- Completed: created in the middle ages

The Brühl (pronounced [bʁyːl]) is a street in the centre of Leipzig, Germany, just within the former city wall. Until the 1930s, it was the international centre of fur trade.

== History ==
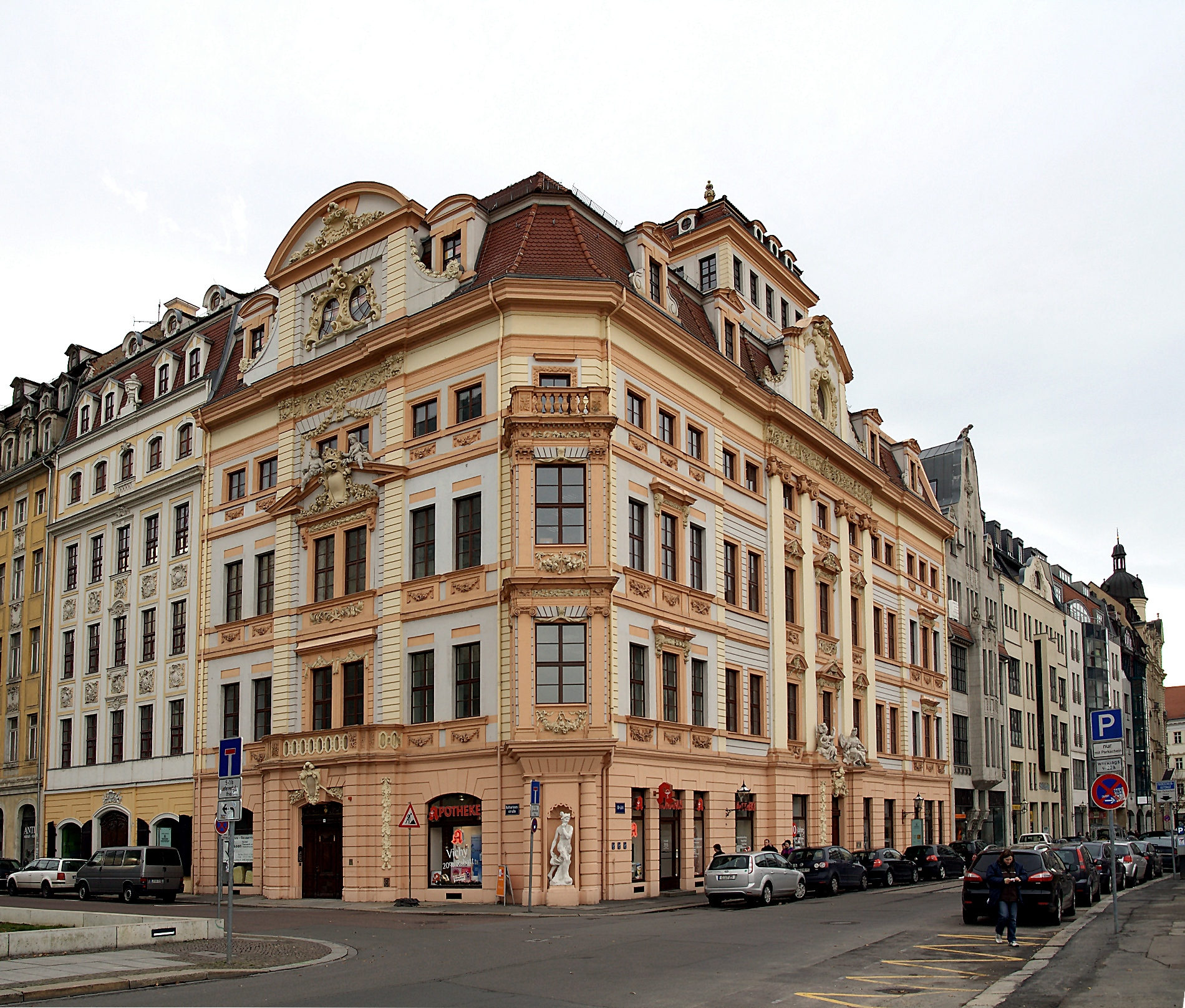
Romanus House

The term Brühl first appears in Leipzig sources in 1420 and initially referred to marshy land (Bruel = marsh). Due to the Parthe floods, the area north of today's Brühl was frequently flooded. The area was only drained in the 13th and 14th centuries. Since the Middle Ages, the Brühl was part of the Via Regia coming from Merseburg and leading further to Meissen.

On the corner of the Brühl and Katharinenstrasse stands the Romanus house, built for the mayor of Leipzig between 1701 and 1704, and one of the finest baroque buildings remaining in the town.

In the late 18th century and early 19th century, the Brühl was part of the Jewish quarter of the city. A synagogue was established in 1763, and Jews visiting the annual Leipzig Fair would lodge in the Brühl and the surrounding streets.

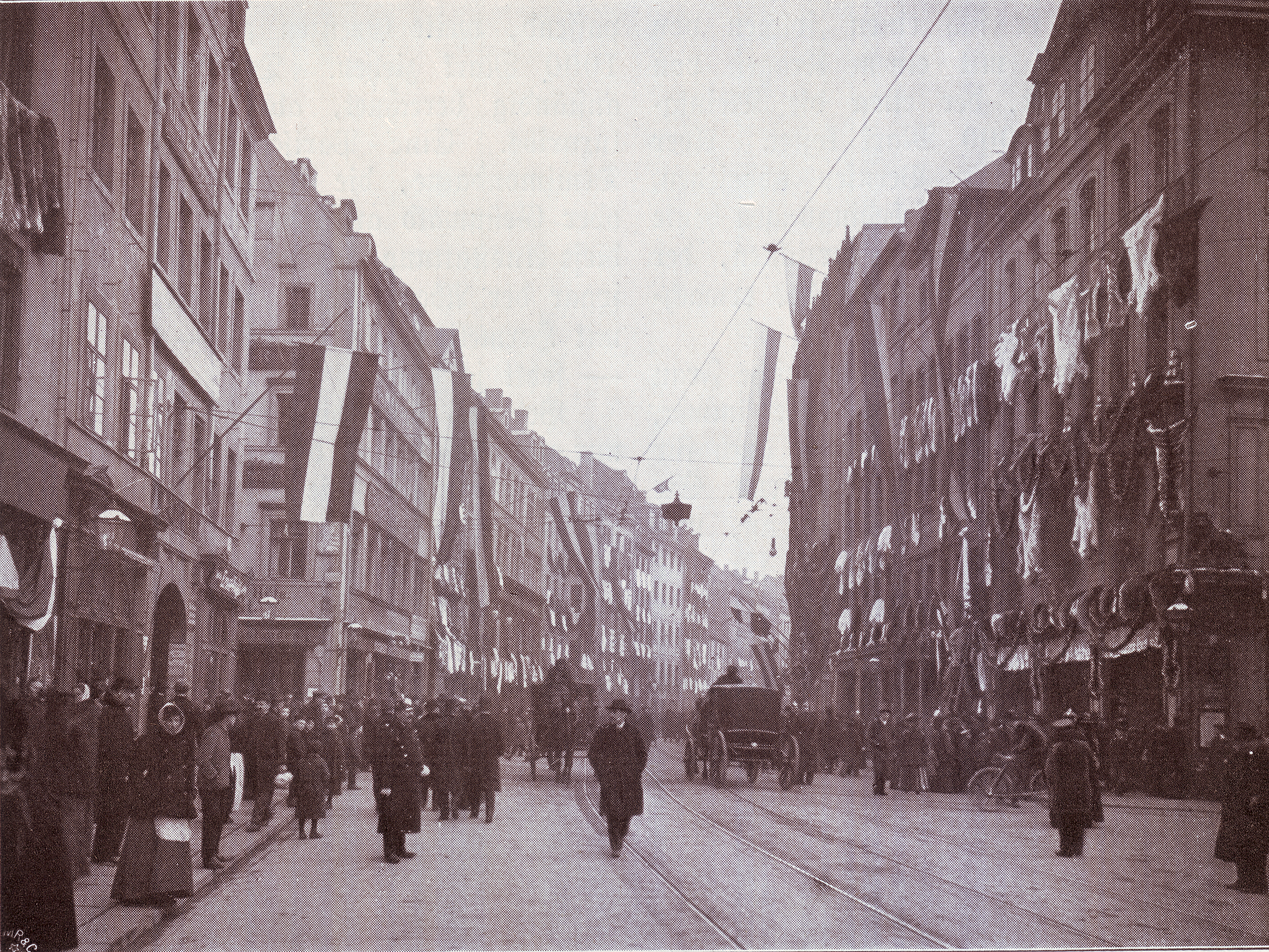
The Brühl in 1905 during the fur fair, the houses decorated with bears and other skins

The Brühl retained Jewish connections into the 20th century. The street was a centre of the world fur trade. Chaim Eitingon, the Russian-born 'king of the fur trade', opened a branch there in 1893, and in the 1920s the street represented one-third of the world trade in furs.

Only 4.2% of Leipzigers as a whole worked in the fur industry, but 8.7% of Jewish Leipzigers did. The Brühl was an emblem of Jewish economic activity in Leipzig, and of the city as a whole.

In 1938, under the Nazi government, "the entire Brühl district changed hands, as fur firms — the pinnacle of Jewish commerce in the city, along with the department stores — were stolen from their owners".

Today the street contains a few 19th-century and early 20th-century buildings, most of the remaining buildings being from the third quarter of the 20th century. A notable modern building is the town's Museum der bildenden Künste (Museum of the visual arts).

== Wagner's birthplace ==
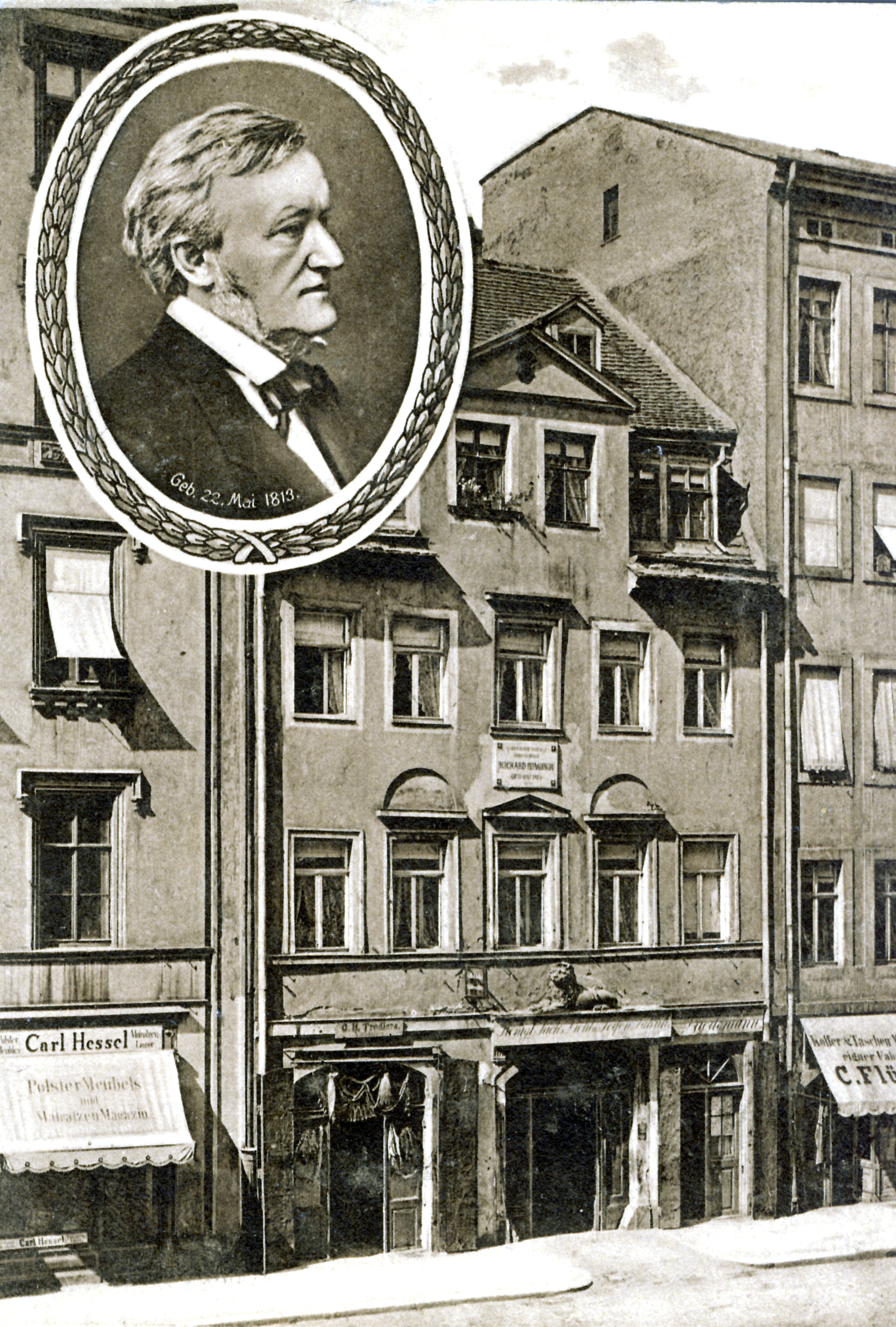
Birth house of Richard Wagner in the Brühl in 1885

It was in the Brühl, in 1813, that the composer Richard Wagner was born at no. 3, the 'House of the Red and White Lions'. Ironically, Wagner's disciple Theodor Uhlig, in an 1850 essay which Wagner was later to build on for his own essay Das Judenthum in der Musik, condemned the music of Meyerbeer by linking it to the Jewish quarters of Leipzig and Dresden: 'If that is dramatic song, then Gluck, Mozart, Cherubini and Spontini carried out their studies at the Neumarkt in Dresden or the Brühl in Leipzig.'

Wagner's birthplace was demolished in 1886, three years after his death, and the site was later occupied by a seven-storey department store, built in 1908. The appearance of the department store changed radically in 1968 when it was coated with a paraboloid-patterned aluminium façade, designed by Harry Müller. The striking metal surface earned this building the nickname Blechbüchse ("tin can").

This building, which became disused in the 21st century, and a number of adjoining residential Plattenbauten, were replaced by a shopping mall called "Höfe am Brühl", which opened in 2012. Part of the facade of the 1968 department store was retained and the new construction contains a memorial to the composer at the site of his birthplace.

A parallel street to the Brühl is now named Richard-Wagner-Straße, and the square at the western end of the Brühl is named Richard-Wagner-Platz.

== Crossing streets ==
The Brühl meets the following streets towards the west (“l” indicates that the street is on the left, “r” on the right):

- Ritterstrasse
- Nikolaistrasse
- Am Halleschen Tor (r)
- Reichsstrasse (l)
- Katharinenstrasse (l)
- Hainstrasse (l)

== Transport ==
The Brühl can be reached by public transport via the tram stops at Tröndlinring in the northwest (“Goerdelerring” stop ) and at Willy-Brandt-Platz in the northeast (“Hauptbahnhof” stop); behind it lies Leipzig Central Station, which connects to destinations throughout Germany.

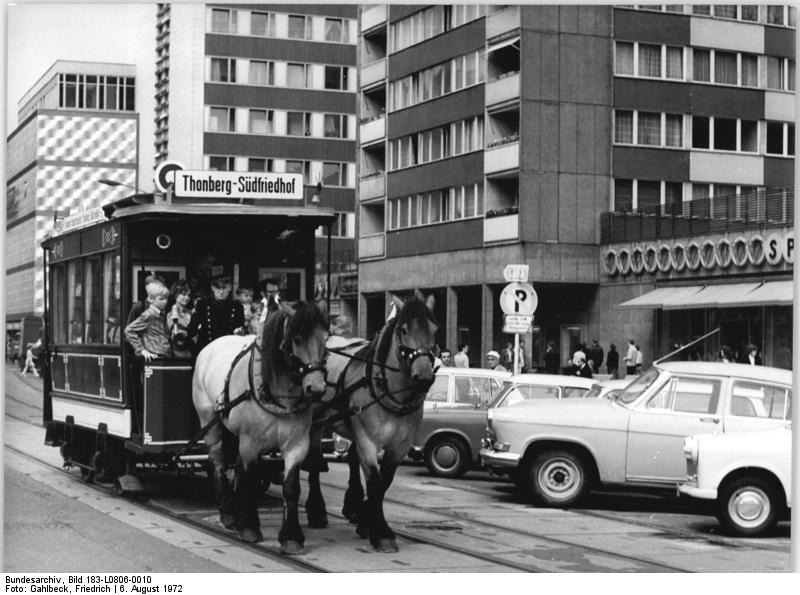
Nostalgic horsecar on Brühl (1972)

In 1882, the Leipzig horse-drawn railway laid the “Lindenau tram route” across the entire Brühl. From 1897 the route was electrified by the successor company, the “Great Leipzig Tram”. The route existed until 1964.

The Brühl can be accessed by car via Goethestrasse, the maximum speed is 20 km/h (12 mph). A limited number of paid short-term parking spaces are available in the restricted parking zone and in Multistorey car parks. In the western part of the street, the Brühl is a pedestrian zone.

== See also ==
- List of arcade galleries in Leipzig
- List of streets and squares in Leipzig
