= Höfe am Brühl =

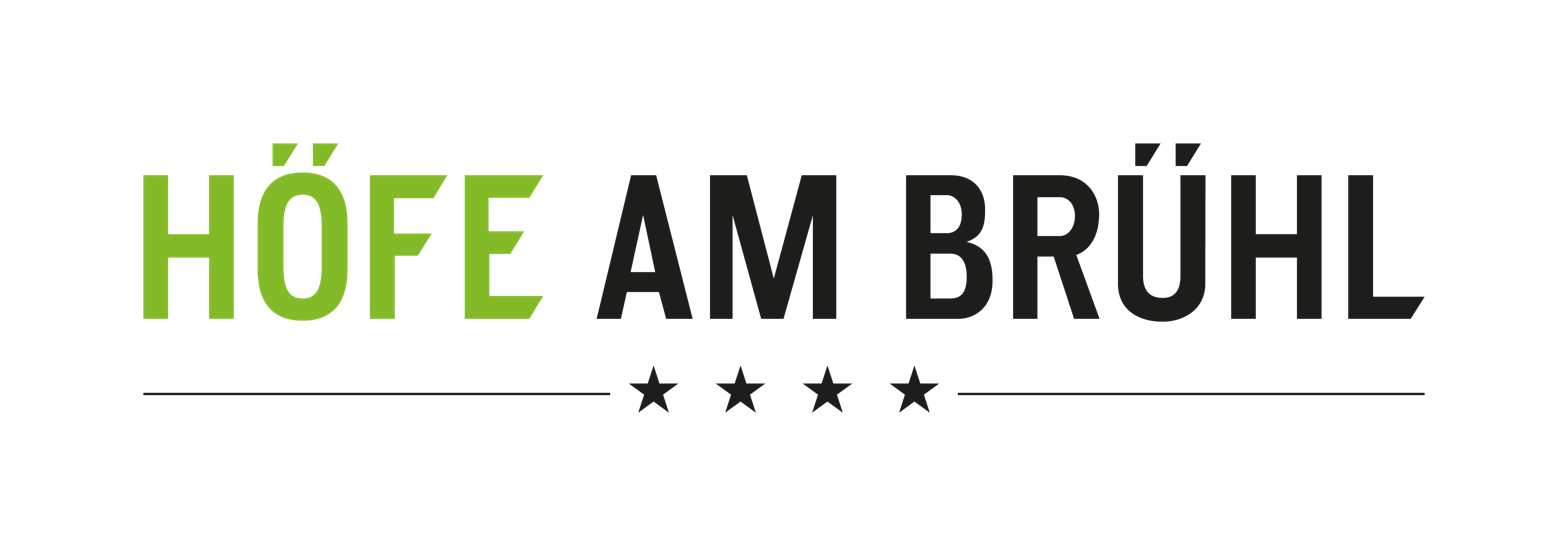

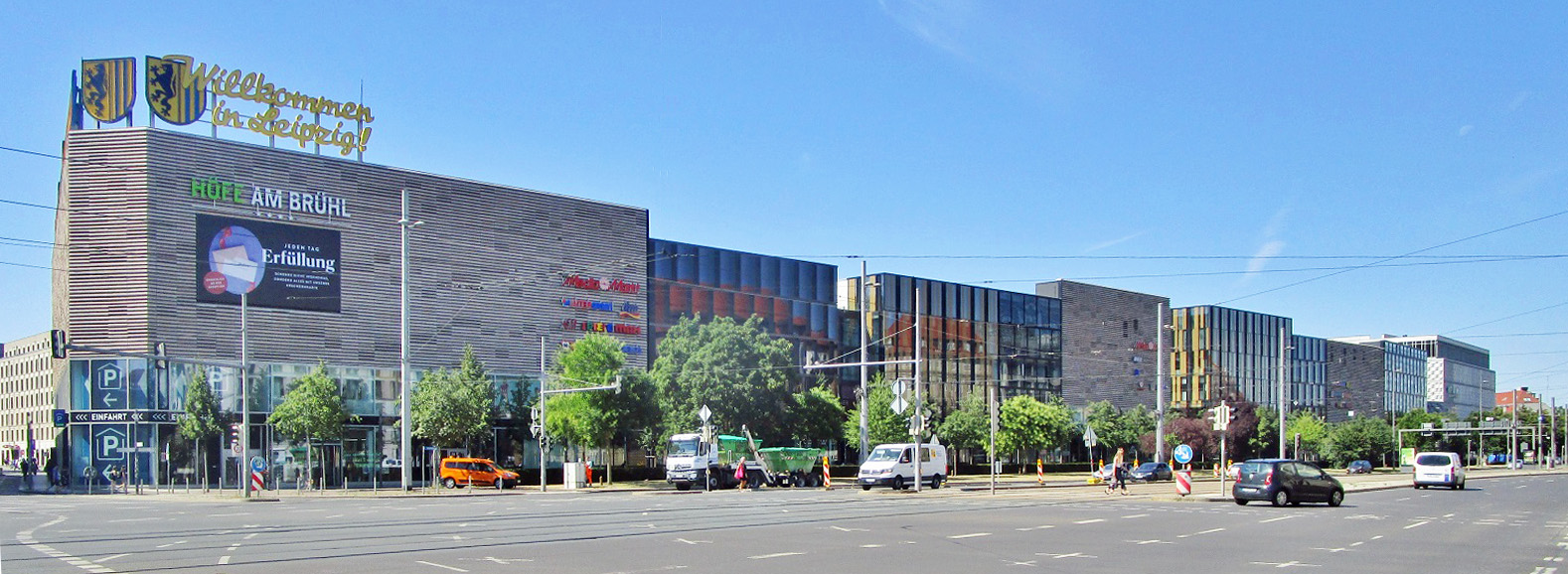
- Höfe am Brühl seen from Tröndlinring (2022)
- Location: Leipzig, Germany
- Coordinates: 51°20′37″N 12°22′30″E
- Address: Brühl 1, 04109 Leipzig
- Opened: 25 september 2012
- Owner: Unibail-Rodamco-Westfield Germany
- Architect: Grüntuch Ernst Architekten
- Num. of stores: 140
- Floors: 3 shopping floors
- Parking: 820
- Public transit: Hauptbahnhof Leipzig, Tram stop Goerdelerring
- Website: http://hoefe-am-bruehl.de/

The Höfe am Brühl (in English language: courtyards at Brühl) is a shopping mall in the city center of Leipzig in Germany.

== Building ==
On an area of approximately 22,300 m^{2} (240,035.2 sq ft) in the basement, first floor and second floor, the Höfe am Brühl offers a retail area of approximately 50,800 m^{2} (546,806.6 sq ft) with 140 shops. There are 820 parking spaces on the third and fourth floors. 31 apartments were built on the fifth floor of the building.

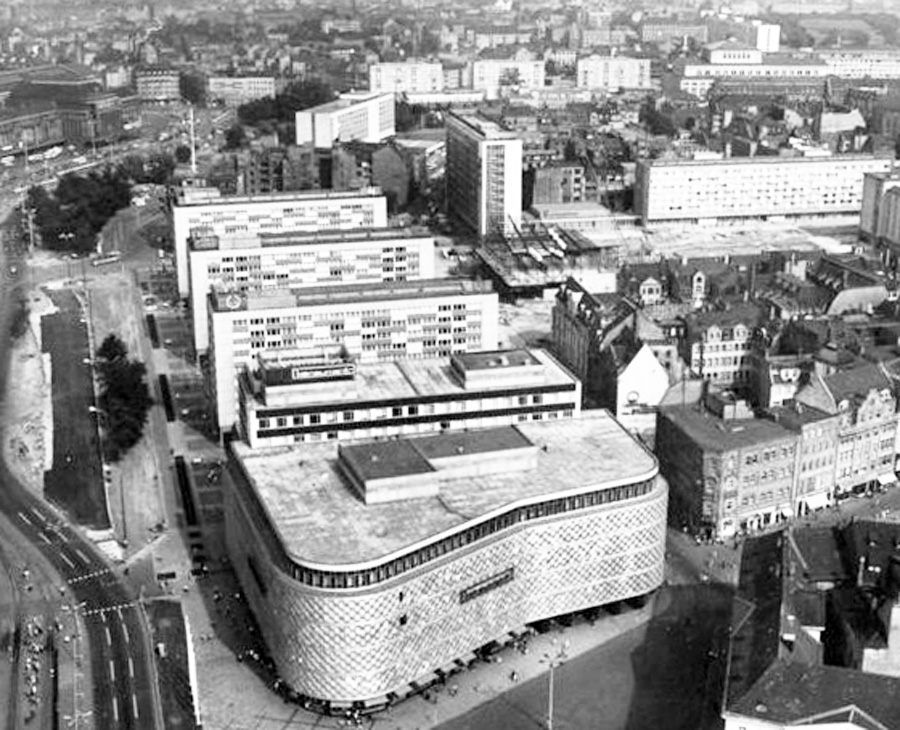
Site of today's Höfe am Brühl between Richard-Wagner-Platz (front) and Am Hallischen Tor (back) in 1969

Prior to construction, the former Konsument department store on Brühl, known colloquially as the Blechbüchse (Tin Can), was demolished. A new building was constructed on the same site with the characteristic, listed aluminum façade of Harry Müller which, like the other parts of the building, houses retail space in the basement and three upper floors, and parking spaces on two floors above.

== History ==
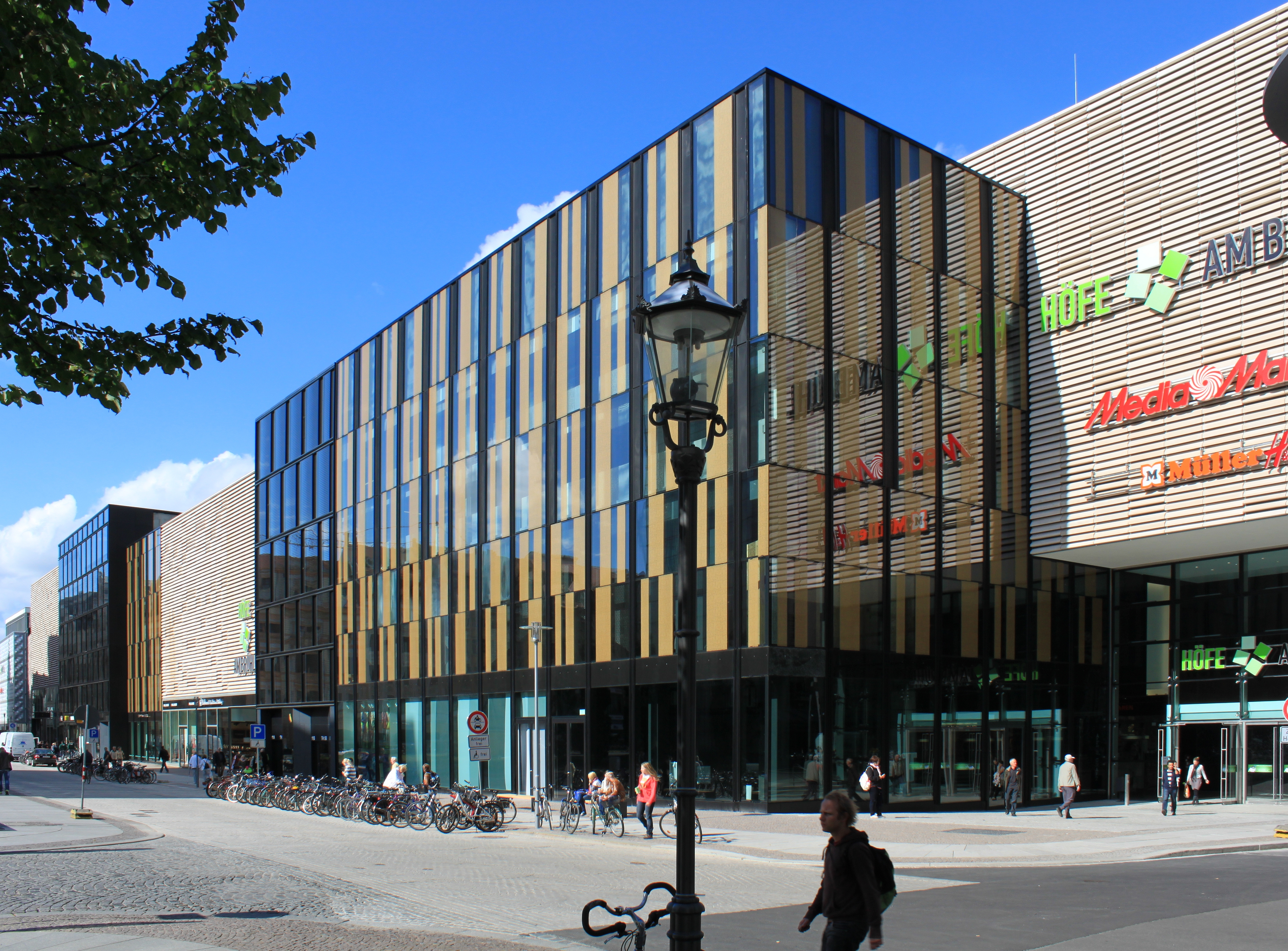
The Höfe am Brühl seen from the corner of Brühl/Am Hallischen Tor

The building was constructed between 2010 and 2012 under the management of mfi management für immobilien AG.

At the site of the Höfe am Brühl, there was previously the empty "Blechbüchse" on Richard-Wagner-Platz and behind it, up to Am Hallischen Tor, three ten-storey apartment blocks with single-storey connecting buildings built in 1966. The residential buildings were demolished in autumn 2007. The gutting and demolition of the Blechbüchse began on 8 February 2010.

The laying of the foundation stone for the Höfe am Brühl took place on 9 December 2010. The topping-out ceremony was celebrated on 8 December 2011. The opening of the building complex was on 25 September 2012.

== Name and concept ==
Before the destruction in the Second World War, there were trading houses on Brühl that were connected to corresponding houses on Richard-Wagner-Strasse via one or more courtyards. In the new building, courtyards with historical references were also created, and this is where the name Höfe am Brühl for the shopping mall comes from.

The art-historical concept, which was developed with the help of art historian Wolfgang Hocquél, takes up the history of the most famous buildings on the old Brühl and integrates them into the new building in the form of display cases in ten staircases and prints on the glass facades. There are four courtyards and various alleys that connect the courtyards.

=== Richard Wagner's birthplace ===
Richard Wagner's birthplace

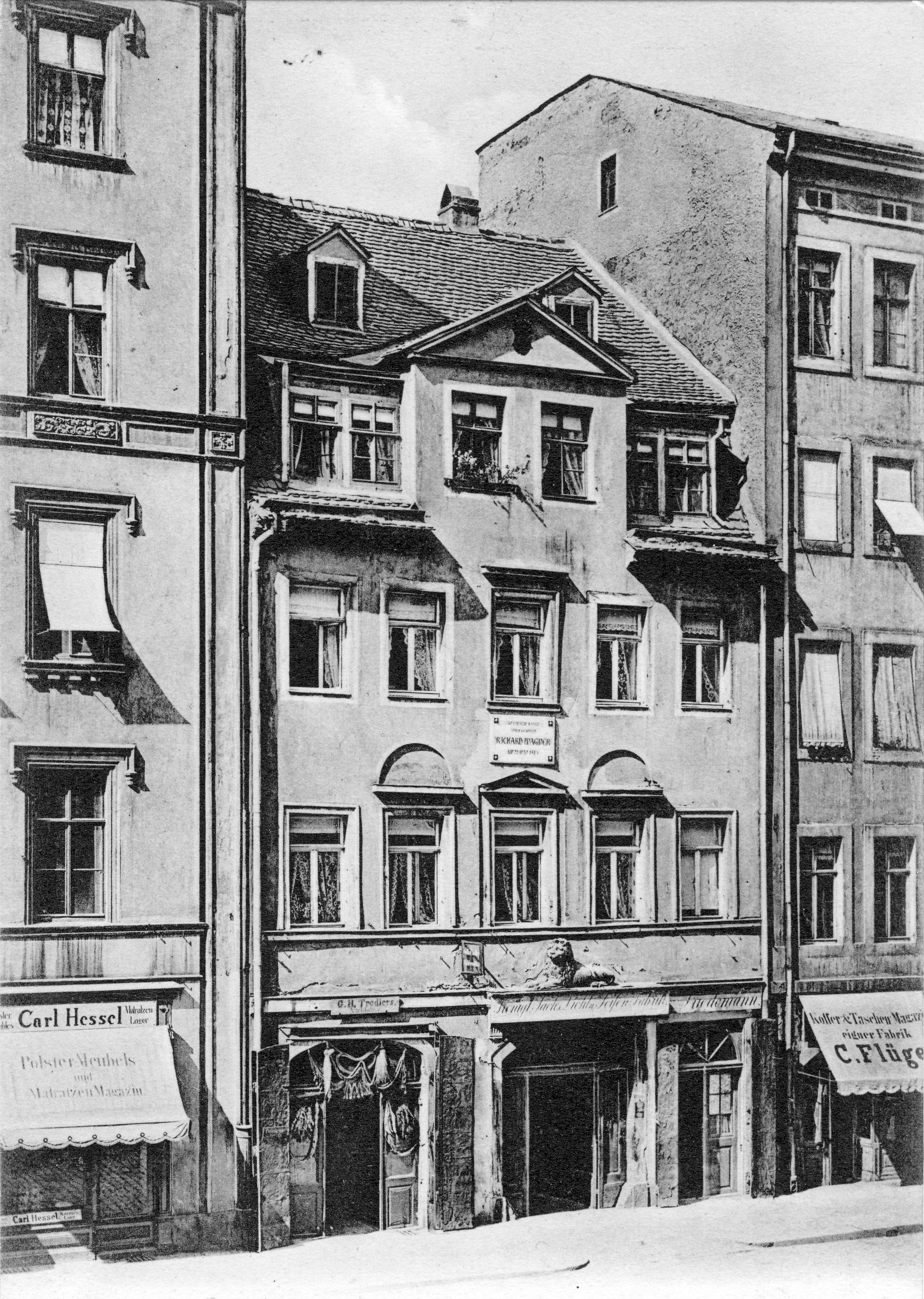
Before 1886

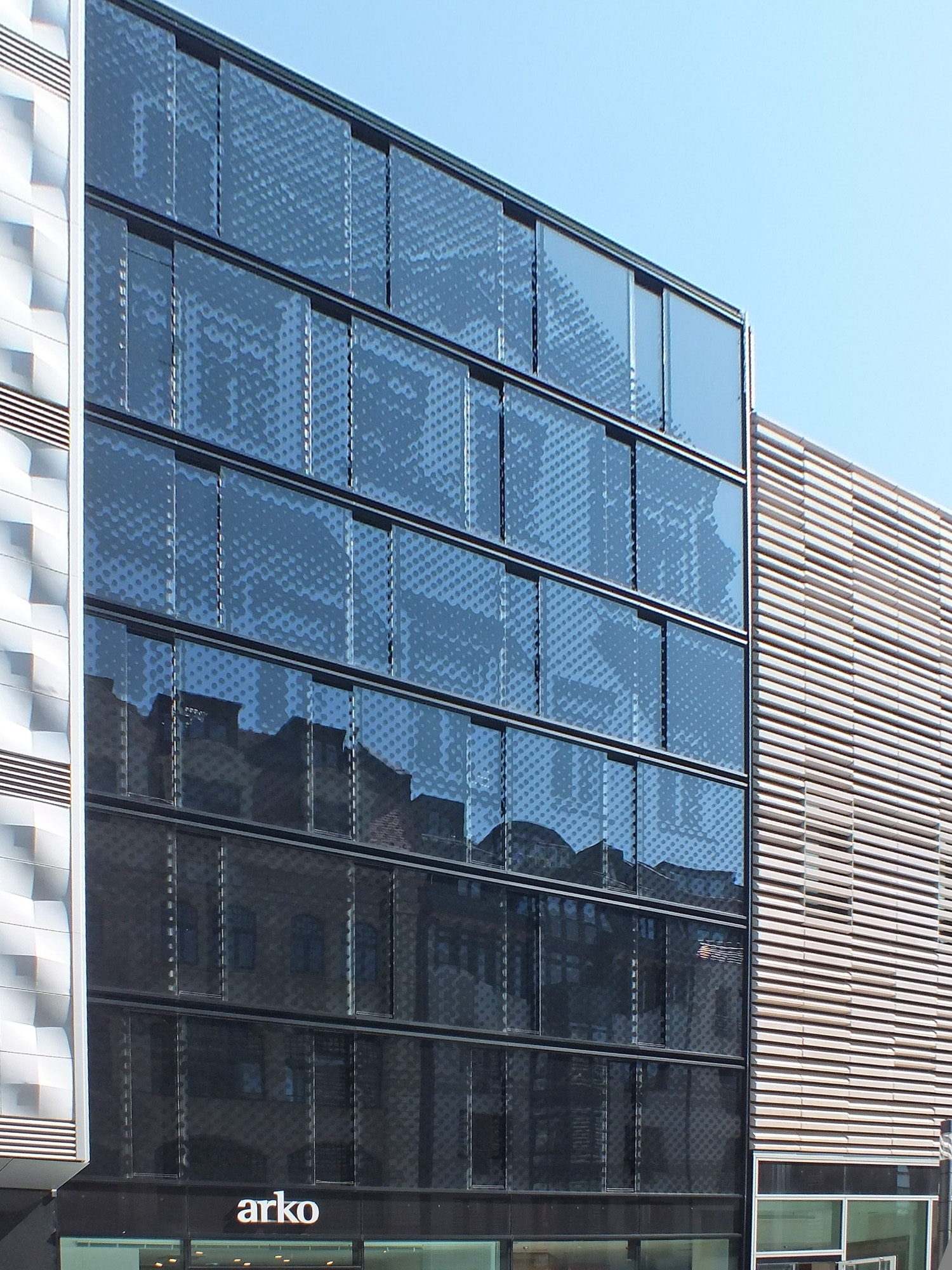
The Wagner House as a dot grid in the same place

The houses Brühl 1 and 3 stood on the site of the extension to the Brühl department store, which was built in 1914. House no. 3 had taken on the additional name Wagner House from its predecessor, the Red and White Lion, which was demolished in 1886. Richard Wagner was born in this house on 22 May 1813. At about the same place, the image of the former house is attached as a dot grid on a glass surface of the new building.

=== Drey-Schwanen-Hof ===
The house at Brühl 7 was an inn that was already called Zum weissen Schwanen in 1578. The name Zu den drei Schwanen (in English language: The three swans) became common in the 17th century. From 1743 to 1778, the Great Concert of the Leipzig Gewandhaus Orchestra took place in this building.

=== Schönkopf Hof, also called Goethehof ===
The house at Brühl 19 was owned by the Schönkopf family from 1716 to 1754. Christian Gottlieb Schönkopf, the father of Anna Katharina Schönkopf, ran an inn there after 1754, where Johann Wolfgang Goethe ate his lunch as a student. In 1926, the Schönkopf house was merged with the neighboring house at number 17. During the planning phase, the Schönkopf house was called the Goethe house.

=== Plauen Hof ===
The old inn at Brühl 23, in whose rooms mainly merchants and hauliers from Plauen stayed, was granted the name Plauenscher Hof in 1804. The property was connected to the house at Richard-Wagner-Strasse 15, where the entrance was also located. In 1863, Ernst Pinkert (1844–1969) took over the old Furmannsgasthof for two years. The complex was demolished in the 1870s and replaced by a new building with commercial businesses. Among other things, it housed the "First Viennese Café" under the owner Louis Pfau from 1900. Pinkert, who constantly presented exotic animals in his two restaurants, became famous as the founder of the Leipzig Zoological Garden in 1878.

With the pedestrian area between Brühl and Richard-Wagner-Strasse, the historical path connection at the former Plauen Hof was restored. It was given the name Plauensche Strasse, which it had already borne until its destruction in the Second World War.

=== Lattermann's Hof ===
The house at Brühl 27, which was connected to Richard-Wagner-Strasse 13, was owned by Franz Lattermann and his heirs from 1814 to 1883.

The newly built Lattermanns Hof is one of the indoor courts of the Höfe am Brühl and is designed to reflect the themes of fashion and lifestyle. The shops located here also come from these sectors.

== Criticism ==
Although the inner-city shopping centre is intended to attract new customers to the city, retailers in the city centre feared a further redistribution of purchasing power and tougher competition to their disadvantage.
