= Inner City Ring Road (Leipzig) =

Street in Leipzig, Germany

Coordinates: 51.3406°N 12.3761°E

The city centre of Leipzig with the Ring Road

The Inner City Ring Road in Leipzig (also called Ring for short) in the district of Mitte is the ring road around Leipzig's city centre. It encloses the just 0.7 km^{2} (0.27 sq mi) large area of the old town without the former Vorstadts.

== History ==
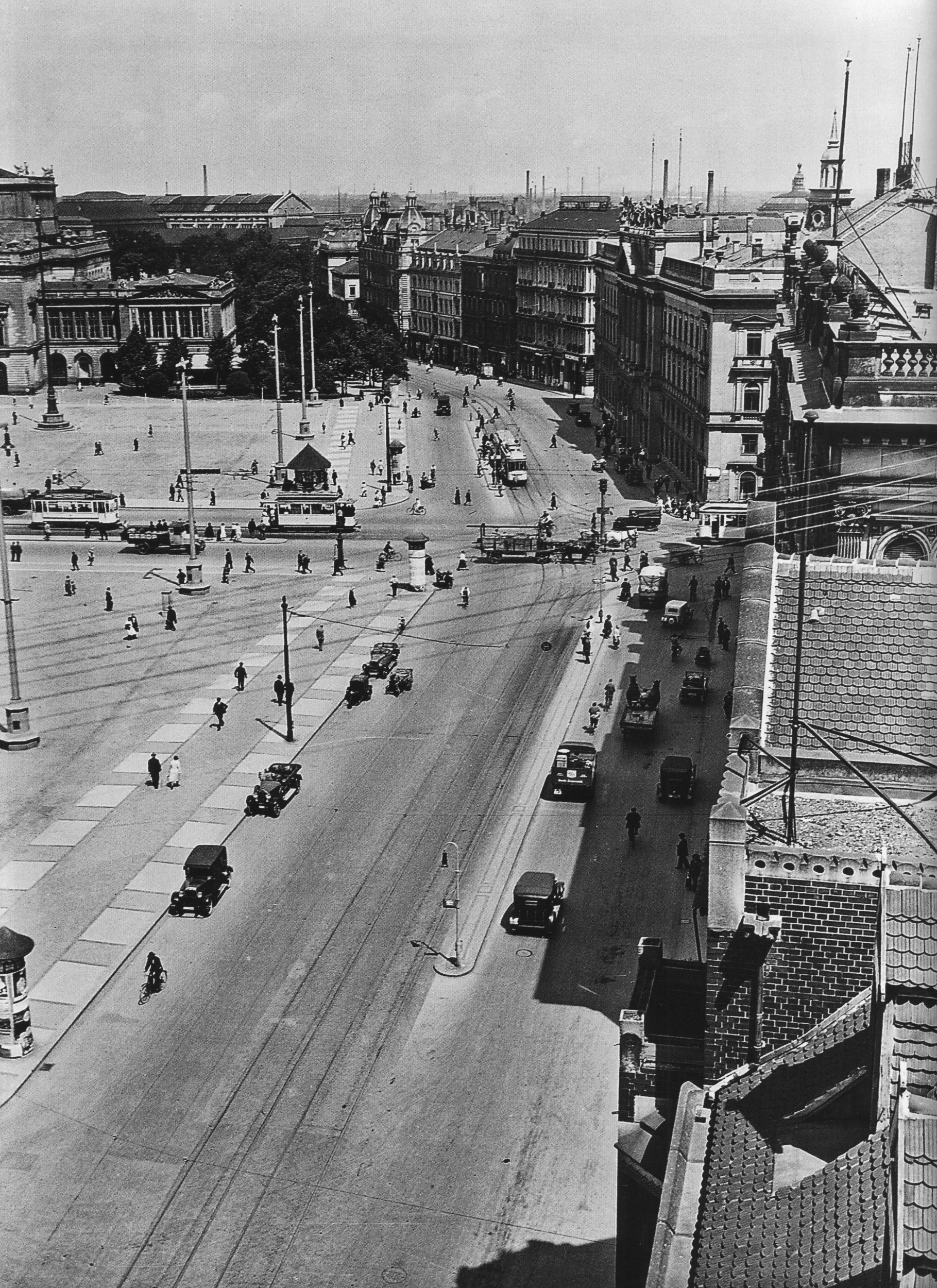
Georgiring with Augustusplatz, view from Europahaus (ca. 1930)

The Leipzig inner city ring road almost completely traces the course of the former town fortifications, which were torn down after the Seven Years' War (1756–1763). Striking corner points within the town fortifications were the town gates. Since the beginning of the 18th century, the fortifications have been planted with avenues, which formed a ring of promenades (in German: Promenadenring), some of which consisted of several rows, up until the middle of the century. The name was transferred to the later horticulturally designed areas, which to this day almost completely surround the city center within the ring road. The Promenadenring is the oldest municipal landscape park in Germany and one of the most important garden and cultural heritage monuments in Leipzig. The expansion to the traffic ring road took place between 1904 and 1912.

During the period of the Peaceful Revolution in 1989, the Monday demonstrations led from Augustusplatz to almost the entire Ring.

== Sections and names of the ring road ==
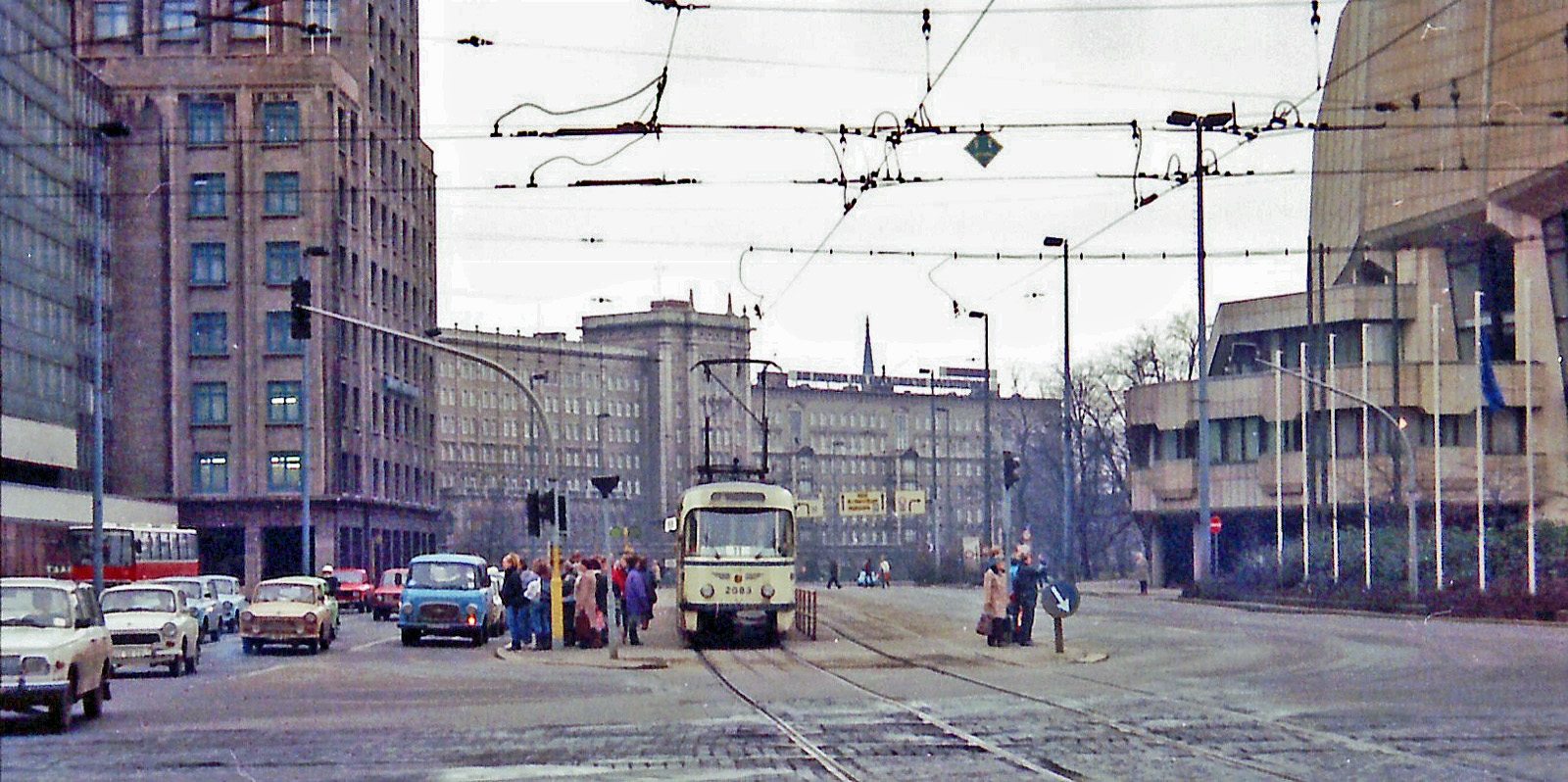
January 1990, the Ring with Gewandhaus (right)

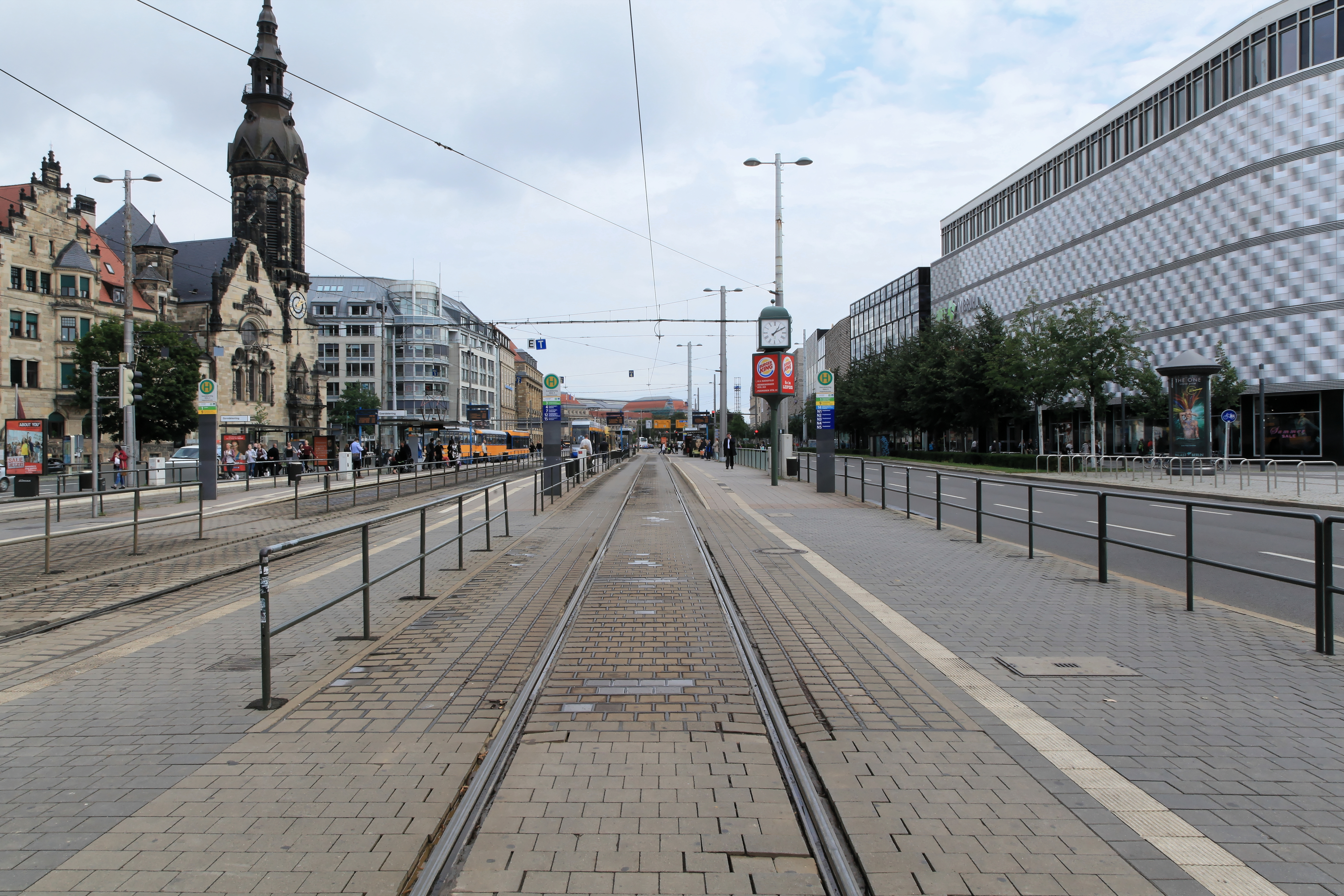
Tröndlinring at the tram stop "Goerdelerring" between Reformed Church and the shopping mall Höfe am Brühl (2016)

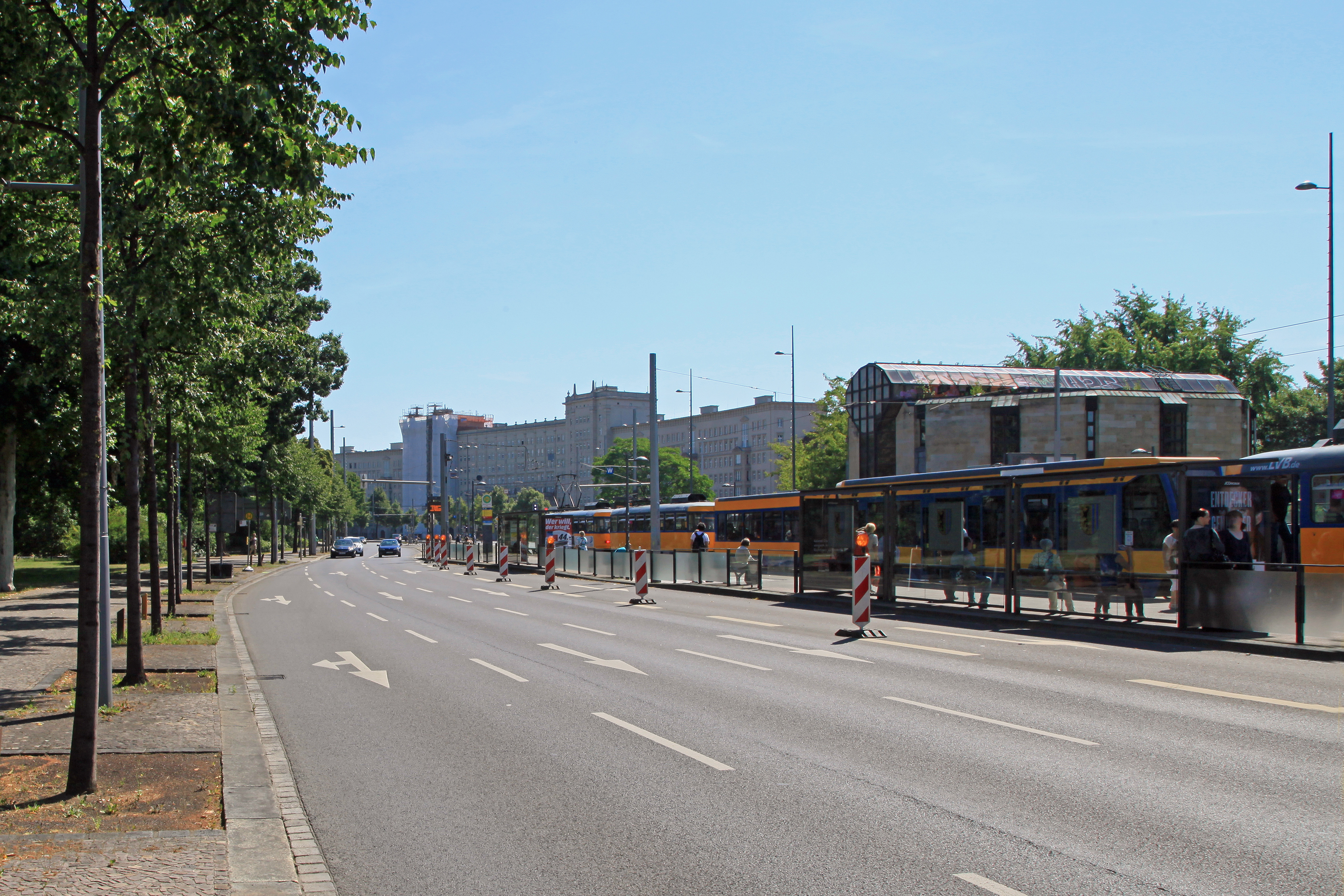
Inner City Ring Road with tram stop Wilhelm-Leuschner-Platz (2015)

The total of the about 3.6 kilometers (2.2 miles) long ring road is now laid out as a four to six lane road with a continuous tram track body and consists of the following sections (starting clockwise at the main station):

- the 1133 meter long (3717 ft.) Willy-Brandt-Platz (named after Chancellor Willy Brandt; formerly the square in front of the Thuringian train station, Blücherplatz, Karl-Legien-Platz and Platz der Republik) in front of Leipzig Hauptbahnhof,
- the 750 meter long (2461 ft.) Georgiring (named after the mayor of Leipzig Otto Georgi; formerly Bahnhofstraße), which runs in a north–south direction,
- the 305 meter long (1001 ft.) east side of Augustusplatz (named after Frederick Augustus I of Saxony; formerly Grimmaischer Thorplatz and meanwhile Karl-Marx-Platz, which stretches from the main façade of the opera to the Europahaus,
- the 409 meter long (1342 ft.) Roßplatz to the south, turning to the west, with the Ringbebauung (Ring development) in the Stalinist architecture style. The green park Schillerpark to the north was designed by Peter Joseph Lenné in 1857,
- the 107 meters (351 feet) long north side of Wilhelm-Leuschner-Platz (named after the social democratic politician Wilhelm Leuschner; formerly Königsplatz, which means King's Place),
- the 593 meter long (1946 ft.) Martin-Luther-Ring (after the reformer Martin Luther; formerly Obstmarkt, An der Pleiße und Rathausring) running from east to west, which turns north in front of the New Town Hall and ends in the Wilhelm-Leuschner-Platz-Nonnenmühlgasse and from Lotterstraße it is divided into a main and a side tour,
- the 468 meters (1,535 feet) long Dittrichring (named after the Mayor of Leipzig, Rudolf Dittrich; formerly An der Pleiße and Thomasring), which is divided by a green area into a main and a side course, which also passes the Thomaskirche, which opens out into Gottschedstraße opposite,
- the 361 meter long (1184 ft.) eastern section of the Goerdelerring (named after the Mayor of Leipzig, Carl Friedrich Goerdeler; formerly the separate Fleischerplatz and Schulplatz squares, which were combined into Friedrich-Engels-Platz in 1945), which follows the course after passing the "round corner"-building continues in a north-easterly direction - the section of the Geordelerring running west between Pfaffendorfer Straße and Jacobstraße and merging into the Ranstädter Steinweg can, because of the after World War II changed road layout are no longer assigned to the actual inner city ring road,
- and finally the 827 meter long (2713 ft.), west–east running Tröndlinring (named after the mayor of Leipzig, Carl Bruno Tröndlin; formerly Am Löhrschen Platze) between Pfaffendorfer Straße and Gerberstraße, which then leads back to Willy-Brandt-Platz.

== Youngest namings ==
Section	Decision-making	Effective Date	Note
Willy-Brandt-Platz	16 November 1993	18 December 1993	
Georgiring		1899	
Augustusplatz	2 October 1990	3 October 1990	
Wilhelm-Leuschner-Platz	1 August 1945		
Martin-Luther-Ring	3 November 1933	10 November 1933	
Dittrichring	3 November 1917	22 December 1917	
Goerdelerring	19 November 1991	1 January 1992	only renaming of Friedrich-Engels-Platz into Goerdelerring
Tröndlinring	20 June 1908	1 January 1909	

== The inner city ring road in the Leipzig road network ==
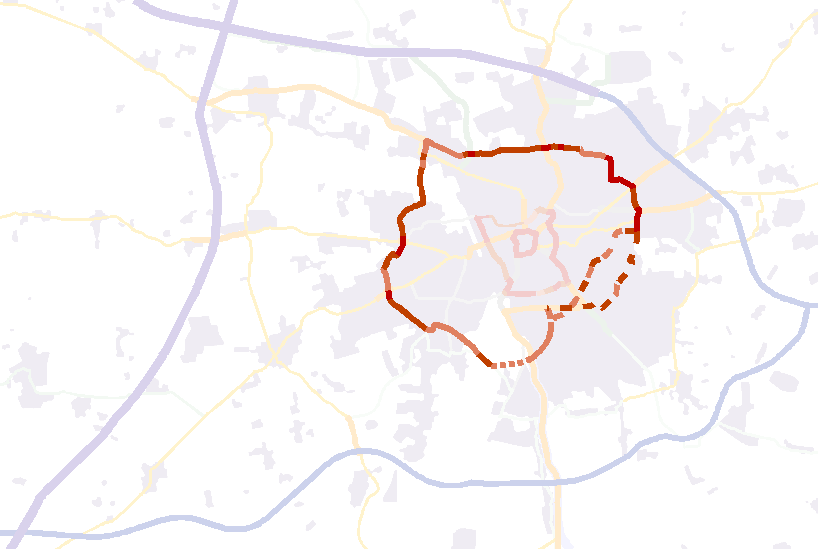
Ring roads in Leipzig, at the very inside the inner city ring road

Depending on the section, the inner city ring road had a traffic volume of 26,000 to 50,000 vehicles/24 hours in 2015. The inner city ring is the innermost ring in the ring system of the Leipzig road network (see figure Ring roads in Leipzig). The figure shows the so-called Tangentenviereck as a further ring, then the (unfinished) Mittlerer Ring (middle ring), highlighted in colour, and the Autobahn on the very outside. Bundesstraße 6 (Willy-Brandt-Platz) and Bundesstraße 87 (Tröndlinring) run over the inner city ring road. The Bundesstraße 2 also ran over the inner city ring road before from the Berlin bridge in the north the connection via Rackwitzer Straße, the east and south side of the Tangentenviereck was passable. The degree of expansion of the inner city ring corresponds to this high traffic volume (72,800 vehicles / 24 hours at the Gerberstraße junction (Hallesches Tor), 30,700 vehicles / 24 hours at the Thomaskirchhof / Gottschedstrasse junction).

== Bicycle traffic ==
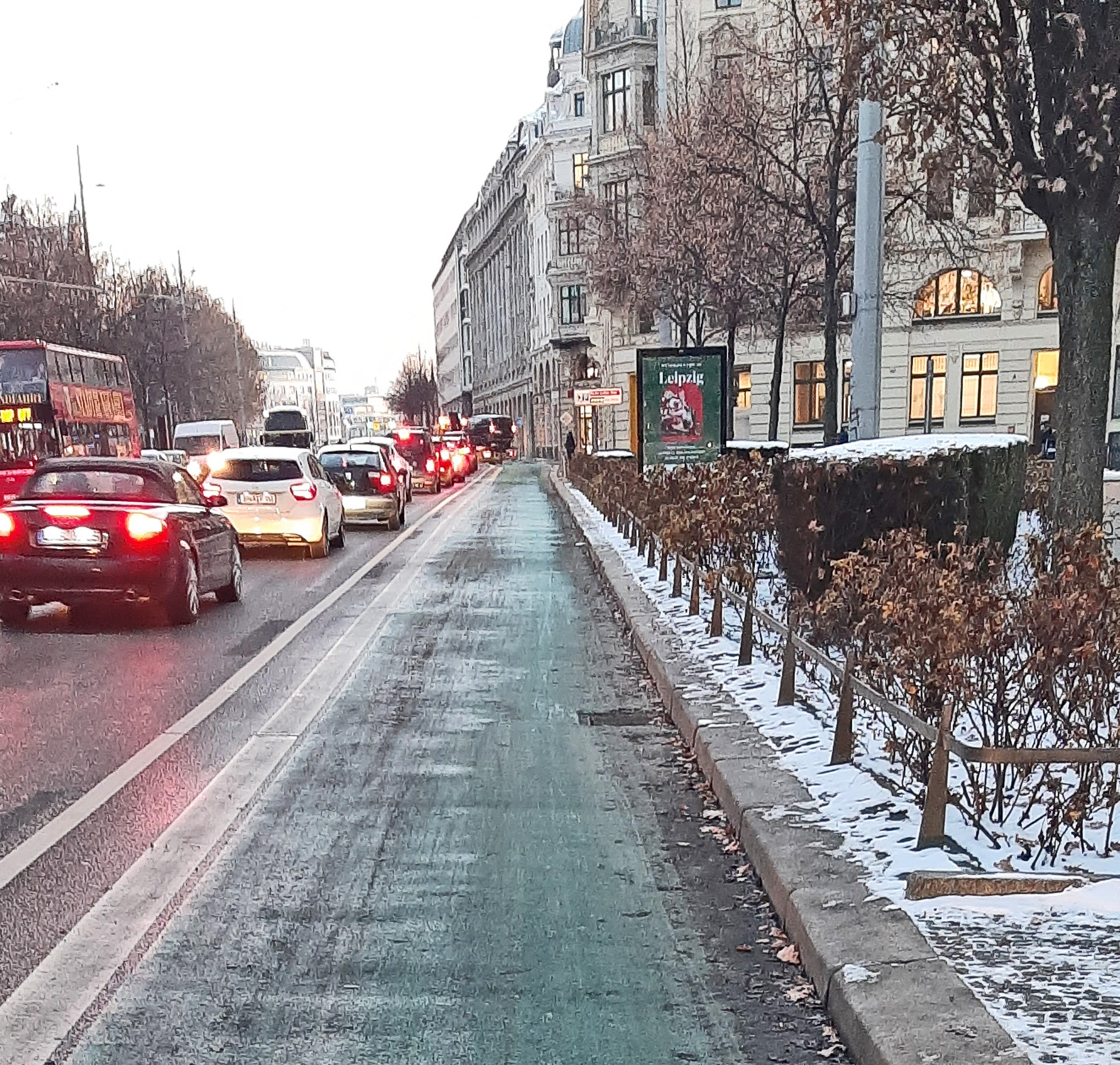
Green bike lane on Martin-Luther-Ring

Since 1975, a minimum speed of 40 km/h (25 mph) was stipulated for the inner city ring by the StVO sign "mandatory minimum speed". On 17 February 2011, the road traffic authority of the city of Leipzig lifted the order for a minimum speed, removed the signs and posted signs with the StVO sign "ban on cyclists". On 22 November 2012, a plaintiff filed an appeal against the ban on cycling on the carriageway on certain sections of the Inner City Ring Road (Promenadenring). He prevailed before the Saxon Higher Administrative Court. The city of Leipzig is implementing the judgment in sections, accompanied by lively public discussions. In 2022, green bike lanes were pigmented on several sections of the inner city ring road.

== Traffic reduction efforts ==
Together with other cities from Poland, the Czech Republic, Italy and Spain, the city of Leipzig took part in the EU project DEMO-EC (Development of sustainable Mobility Management in European Cities) from 2014 to 2020. The contribution of the city of Leipzig was an investigation under the title "Enlargement of car reduced downtown in the inner city of Leipzig". The topic was approached in an interdisciplinary manner by urban, traffic and environmental planning. In the 2018/19 winter semester, students at the Bauhaus University in Weimar developed urban designs under the motto "Reinventing the Ring", which are documented. On the one hand, there was a return to the previous history of the ring as a green promenade ring, on the other hand, a preview of expected future developments. The modal split in Leipzig is changing in the direction of a rapidly growing share of cycling. A strong increase in population is forecast for the Mitte district in particular (2015: 61,977 inhabitants, forecast for 2030: 82,549 inhabitants), which in turn means that an increase in traffic volume must be expected.

== See also ==
- List of streets and squares in Leipzig

== Literature ==
- Griebsch, Gernot; Klank, Gina (1995). Lexikon Leipziger Straßennamen (in German). Leipzig: Verlag im Wissenschaftszentrum. ISBN 3-930433-09-5.
- Nadja Horsch, Simone Tübbecke (Hrsg.): Bürger Gärten Promenaden. Leipziger Gartenkultur im 18. und 19. Jahrhundert. Passage-Verlag Leipzig 2018, ISBN 978-3-95415-072-4. (in German)
- Andreas Martin, Der Leipziger Promenadenring. Eine Rundfahrt., Lehmstedt Verlag Leipzig 2011, ISBN 978-3-937146-85-0. (in German)
