= Harry Müller =

German sculptor (1930–2020)

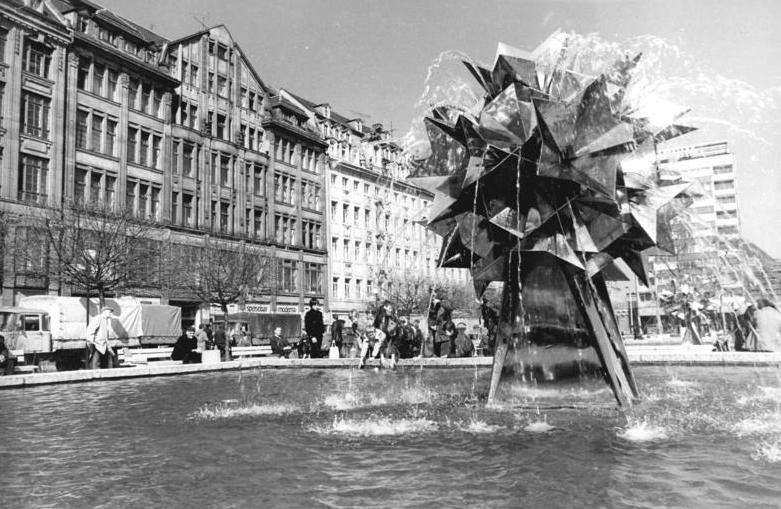
- Sculpture of a fountain in Leipzig
- Born: 25 September 1930; Leipzig, Saxony, Germany
- Died: 19 April 2020 (aged 89); Germany
- Occupation: Sculptor

Harry Müller (25 September 1930 – 19 April 2020) was a German sculptor.

== Biography ==
Müller first studied in Leipzig in 1951, and then was a student of Waldemar Grzimek at the Weißensee Academy of Art Berlin from 1953 to 1960. He developed his own abstract and geometric style, inspired by Selman Selmanagić.

After his studies, Müller returned to Leipzig and produced abstract sculptures inspired by Jean Arp and Buckminster Fuller. He did not exhibit his works, but participated in architectural projects across the city of Leipzig in the 1960s and 1970s. He notably sculpted the aluminum facade of the Blechbüchse (now Höfe am Brühl) and sculptures of the Sachsenplatz fountain.
