= Fair in Gorna Oryahovitsa =

The first fair of technological products was held in Gorna Oryahovitsa in 1925. The idea of holding the sample fair came from the trader Stefan Obreshkov. A Fair Committee is being established. Participants in it include companies from Europe and the world such as: Fiat, Ford, Siemens, Philips, Bulgarian companies and others. The last edition of the fair was held in 1932, after which it moved to Plovdiv.
