= Specks Hof =

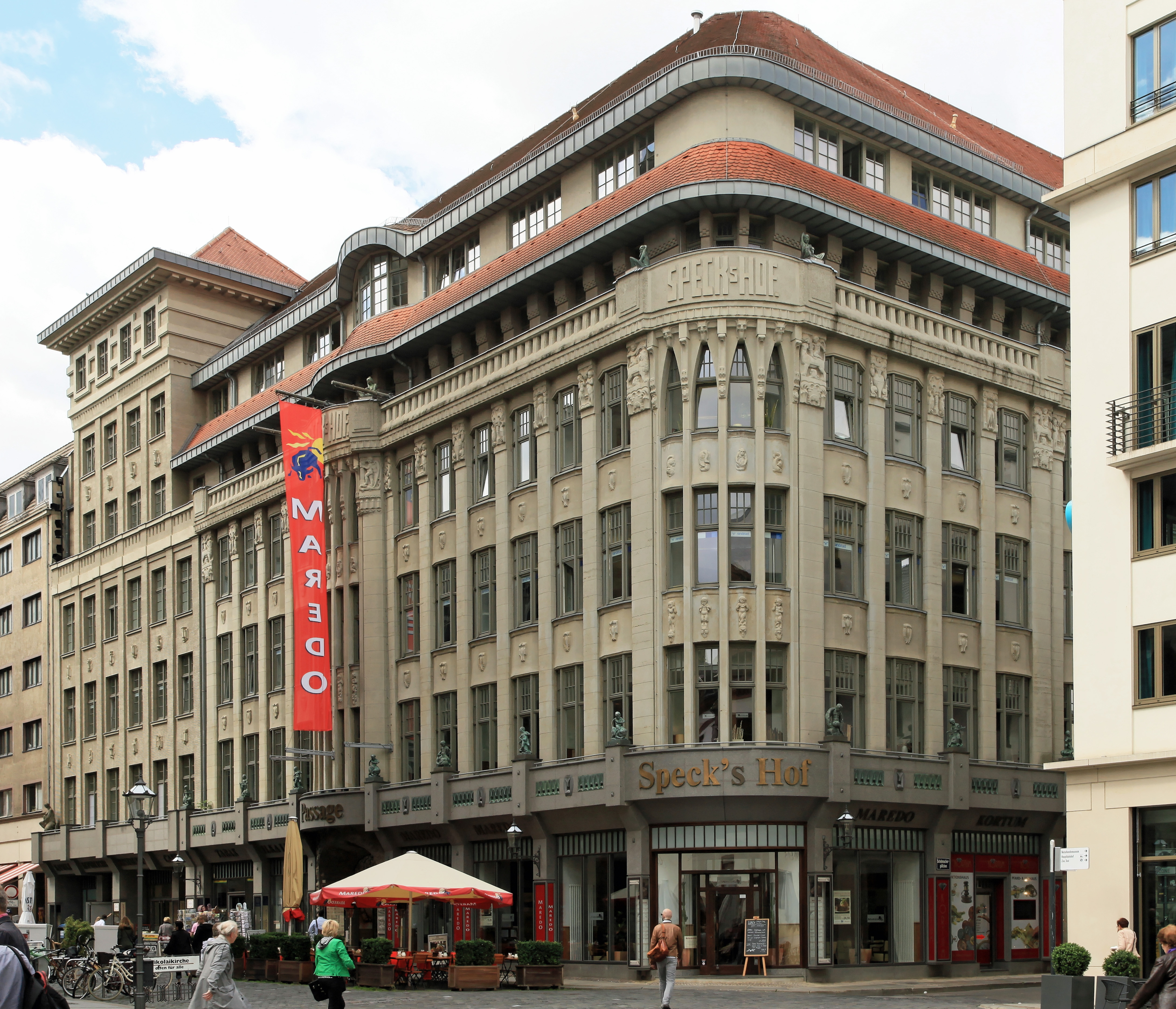
- Specks Hof, from Nikolaistrasse (2011)
- Interactive map of the Specks Hof area

General information
- Type: Commercial building with a shopping arcade
- Architectural style: Art Nouveau, Art Deco
- Location: Reichsstrasse 4 and Nikolaistrasse 8-9, Leipzig, Germany
- Coordinates: 51.340369°N 12.377396°E
- Current tenants: Leibniz Institute for the History and Culture of Eastern Europe, Randstad NV, Aldi Nord, English books
- Construction started: 1908
- Completed: 1929
- Renovated: 1993-1995

Technical details
- Floor count: 6

Design and construction
- Architect: Emil Franz Hänsel
- Architecture firm: RKW architects (1993-1995)

Website
- https://speckshof.de/de/

Specks Hof is a commercial building with the oldest preserved shopping arcade in Leipzig, Germany. The complex near St. Nicholas Church is an example of Leipzig's trade fair and trading buildings, which were built at the beginning of the 20th century.

== Location and description ==
Specks Hof stretches over 82 m (269.0 ft) along Schuhmachergäßchen between Reichsstrasse and Nikolaistrasse, where the building has front lengths of 40 m (131.2 ft) and 47 m (154.2 ft) respectively. To the south it borders on the Reichshof, the Hansahaus and the post-war new building with the oriel window called Fürstenerker. The postal addresses are Reichsstrasse 4 and Nikolaistrasse 3–9.

Specks Hof has six floors. In the first three upper floors, the principle of post and lintel is clearly visible through the emphasis on the continuous pilasters. The upper two floors are slightly set back behind a baluster or a narrow strip of roof. In each of the three adjacent streets there is a basket-arch-like passage entrance, each of which, like the two corners of the building, is accentuated by a rounded risalit. On the front, clad in trachyte tuff and cast stone, there is plenty of architectural decoration, both in stone and on the plinth above the ground floor and above the third floor, in copper. The figures are borrowed from the Greek gods and have no connection with the purpose of the building.

The southern part of the front on Nikolaistrasse, which was built later, differs in its design from the rest of the building. It is more simple and, instead of the two upper floors, has a three-storey tower-like structure with a pyramid roof that extends beyond the ridge line of the outbuildings.

The ground floor of the building is traversed by barrel-vaulted passageways, some of which still have embossed copper ceilings. One passageway runs from Reichsstrasse to Nikolaistrasse with a branch into Schuhmachergäßchen; a branch leads to Hansahaus. The passageways are interrupted by three glass-covered atriums, which begin in the west and are labelled A, B and C and have floor areas of between 40 m^{2} (430.6 sq ft) and 50 m^{2} (538.2 sq ft). Their walls are artistically designed.

Arcade gallery and atriums

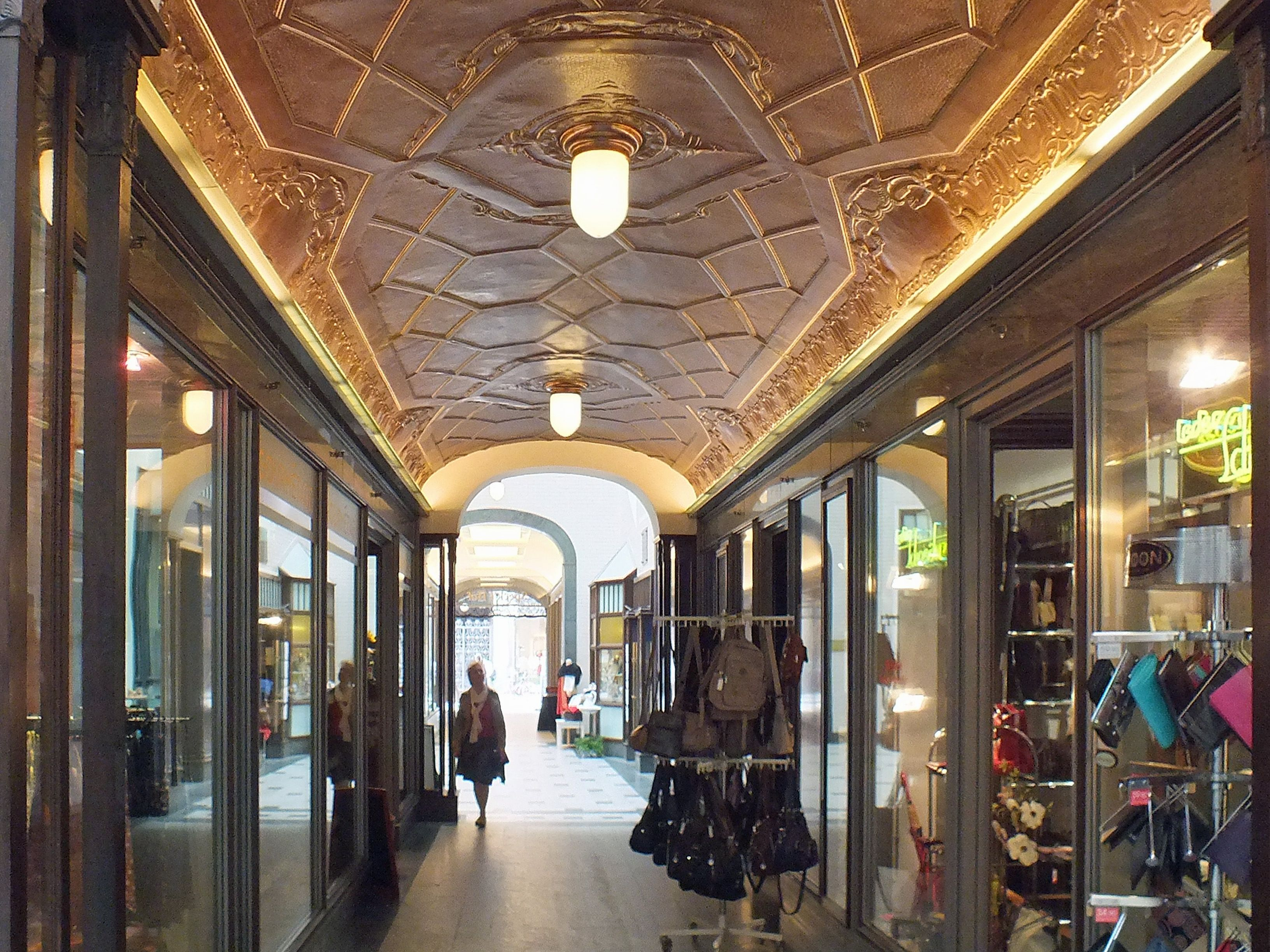
Passageway

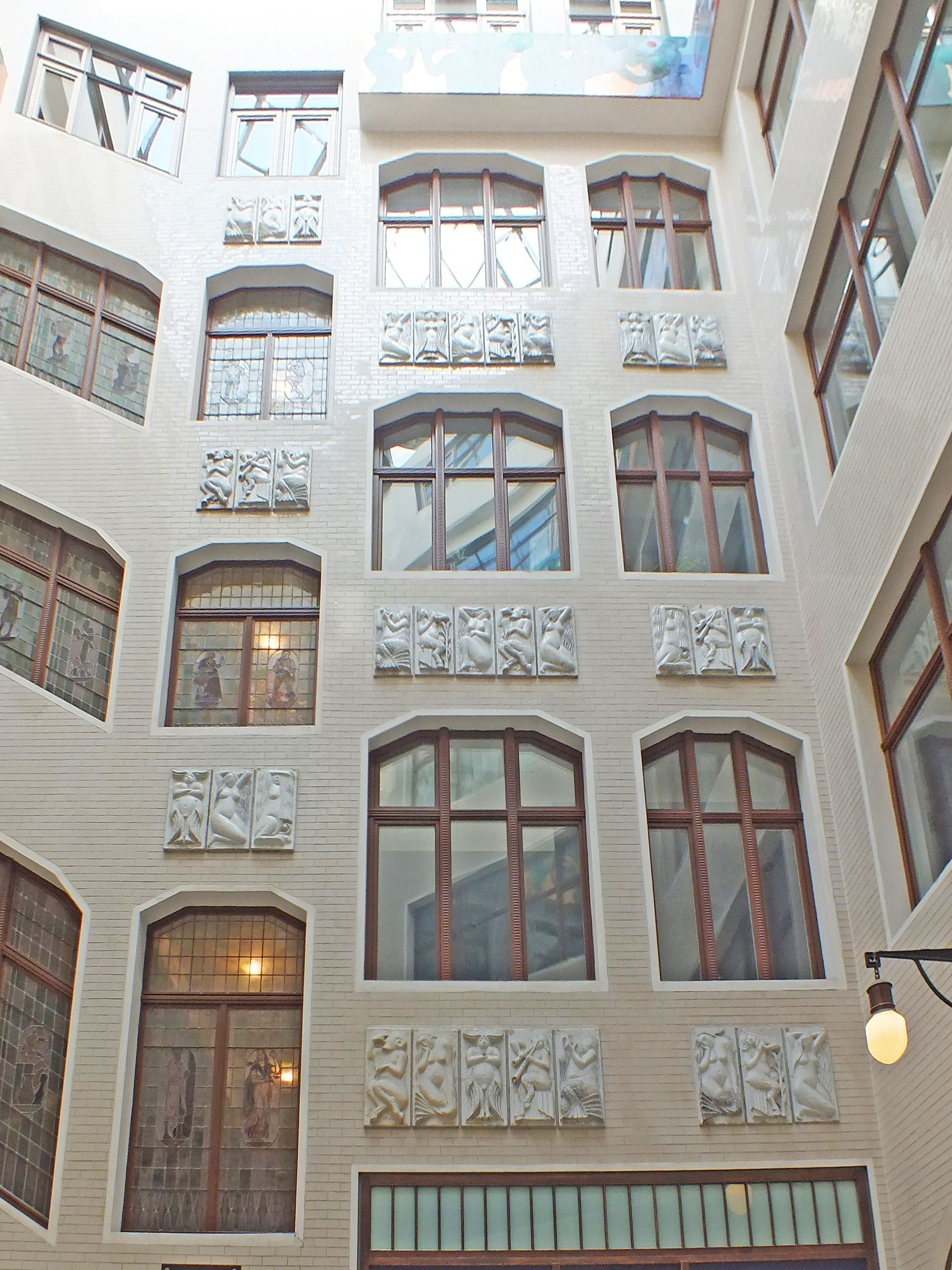
Atrium A

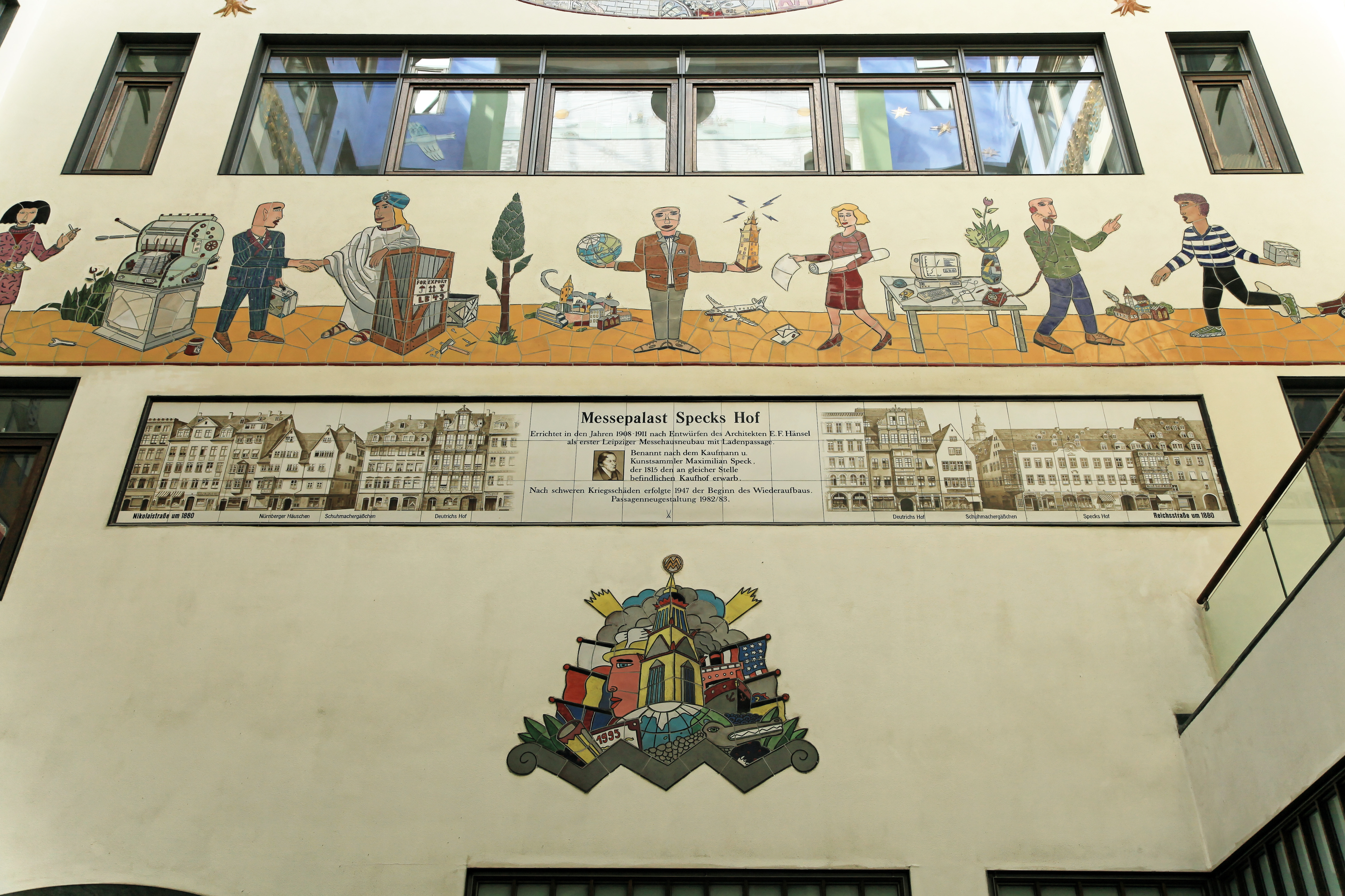
Details in atrium B

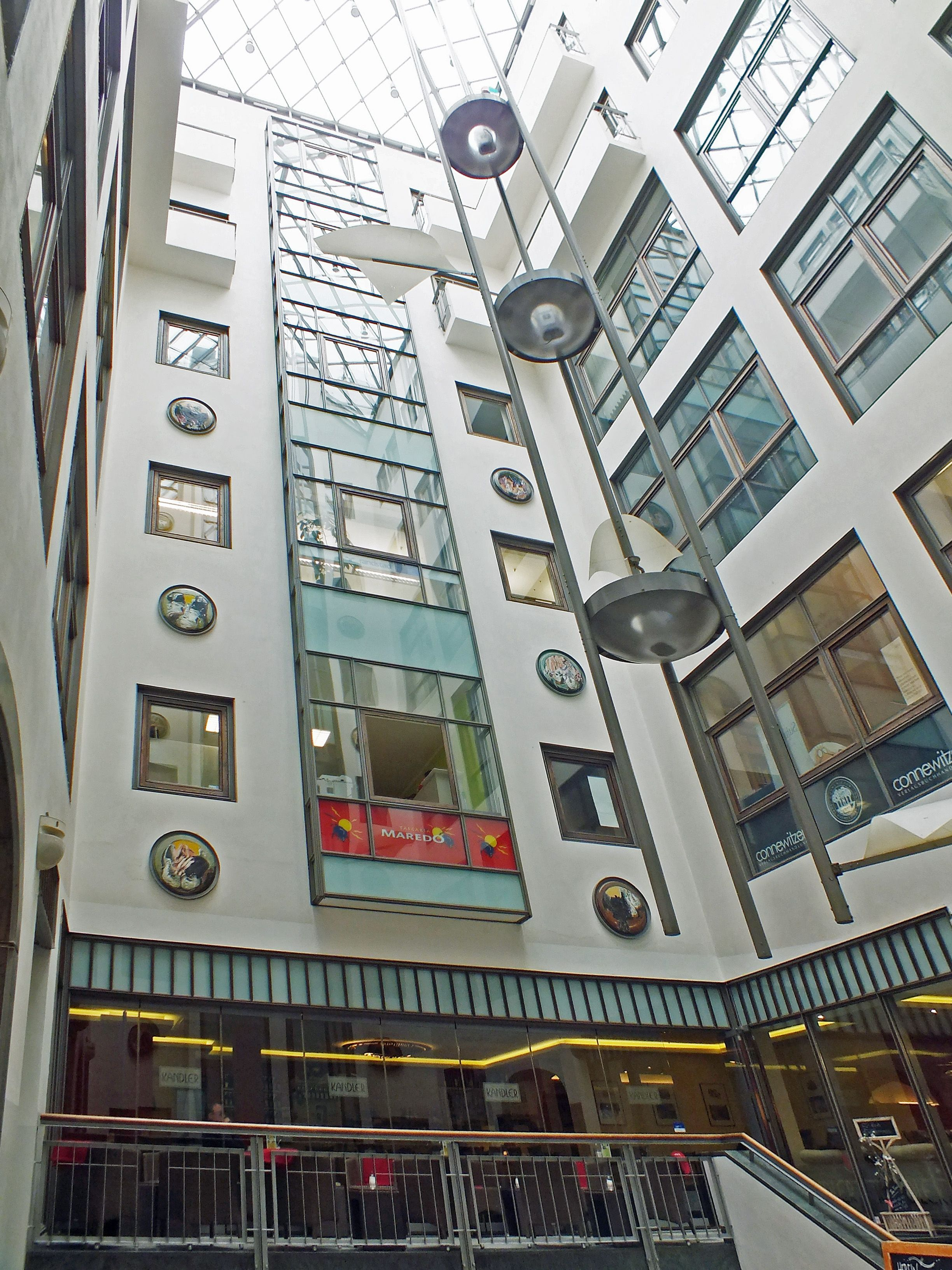
Atrium C with Café

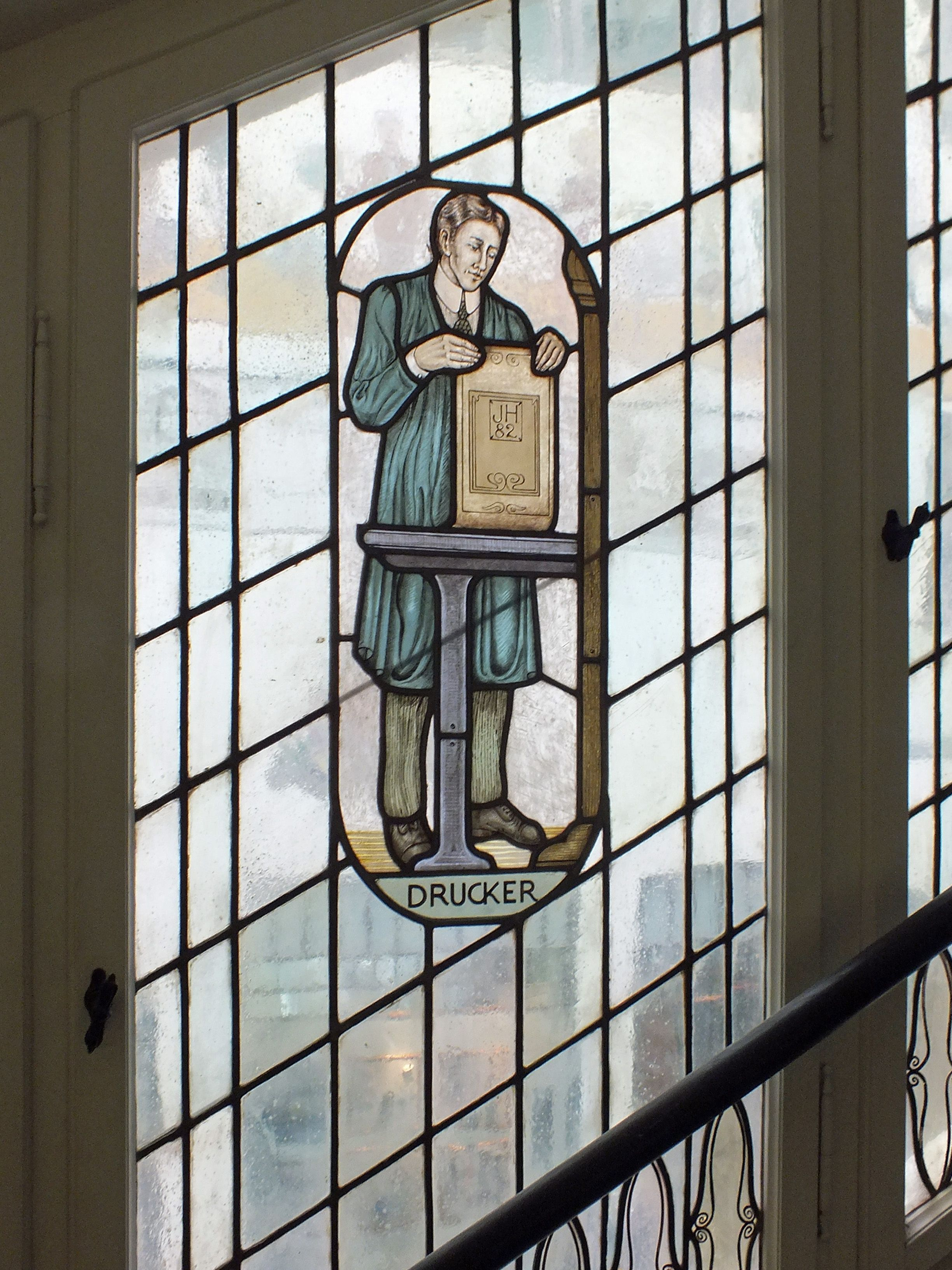
Staircase window atrium B

In atrium A, 33 white terracotta panels by Peter Makolies (* 1936) are installed. Above the fourth floor is a frieze by the Leipzig painter Bruno Griesel (* 1960) with the theme "Psychology of Time". In courtyard B, the previous buildings in Nikolaistrasse (left) and Reichsstrasse (right) are depicted in large format on Meissen tiles based on a design by the Leipzig painter Heinz-Jürgen Böhme (* 1952). Above this, the wall frieze by Moritz Götze (* 1964) "Morning, Noon, Evening" rises over several floors on over 20,000 colored ceramic panels. Atrium C is decorated with 16 medallions depicting everyday objects, primarily shoes, in an enamel glaze technique by Johannes Grützke (1937–2017). In the stairwells of atriums A and B, original leaded glass panes designed by the painter Paul Horst-Schulze (1876–1937) are still present.

While the upper floors house offices, the ground floor is entirely occupied by retail establishments, including two restaurants, many of which can also be reached, or only, via the passageways and atriums.

== History ==
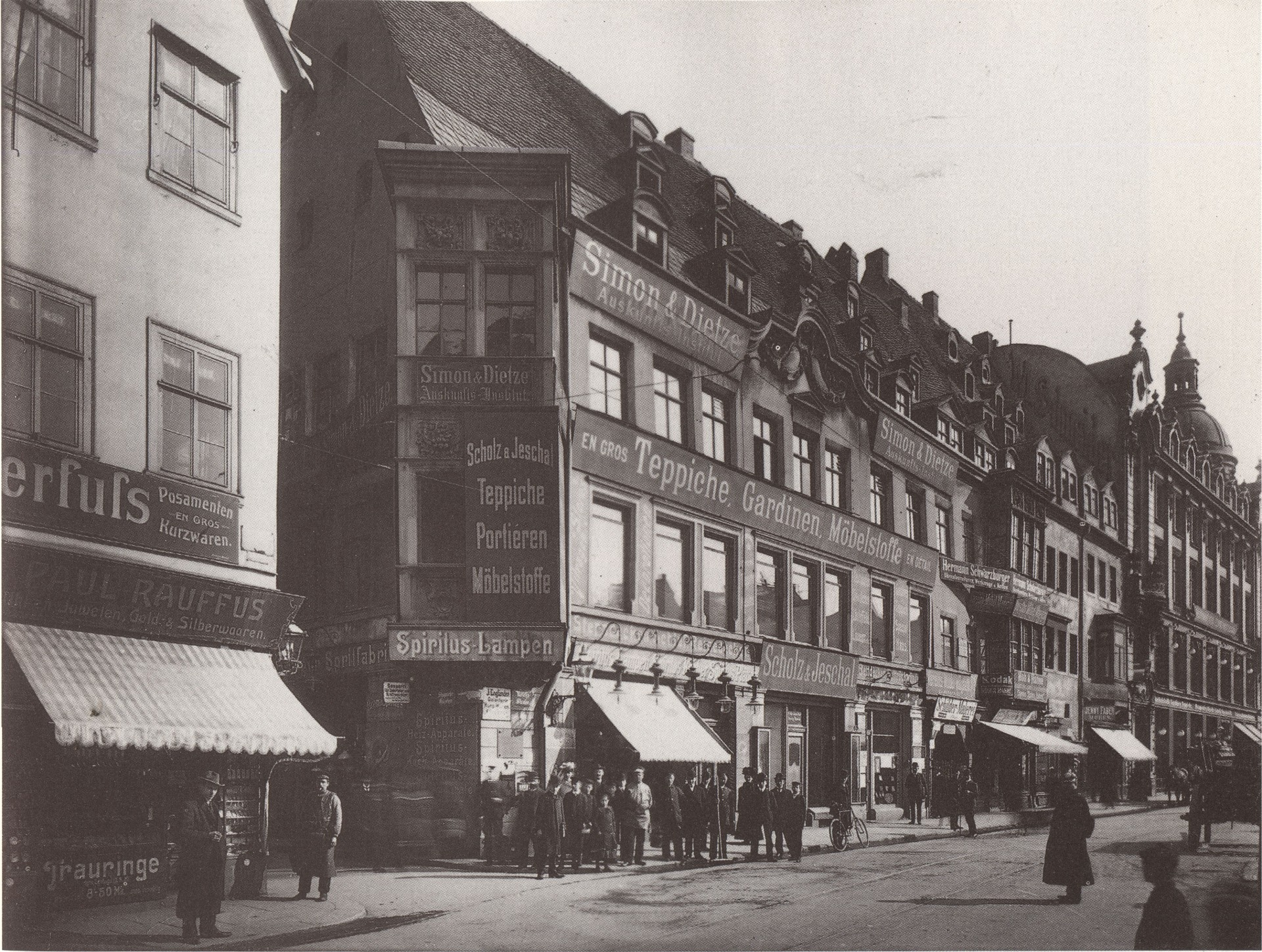
The predecessor building in Reichsstrasse (around 1900)

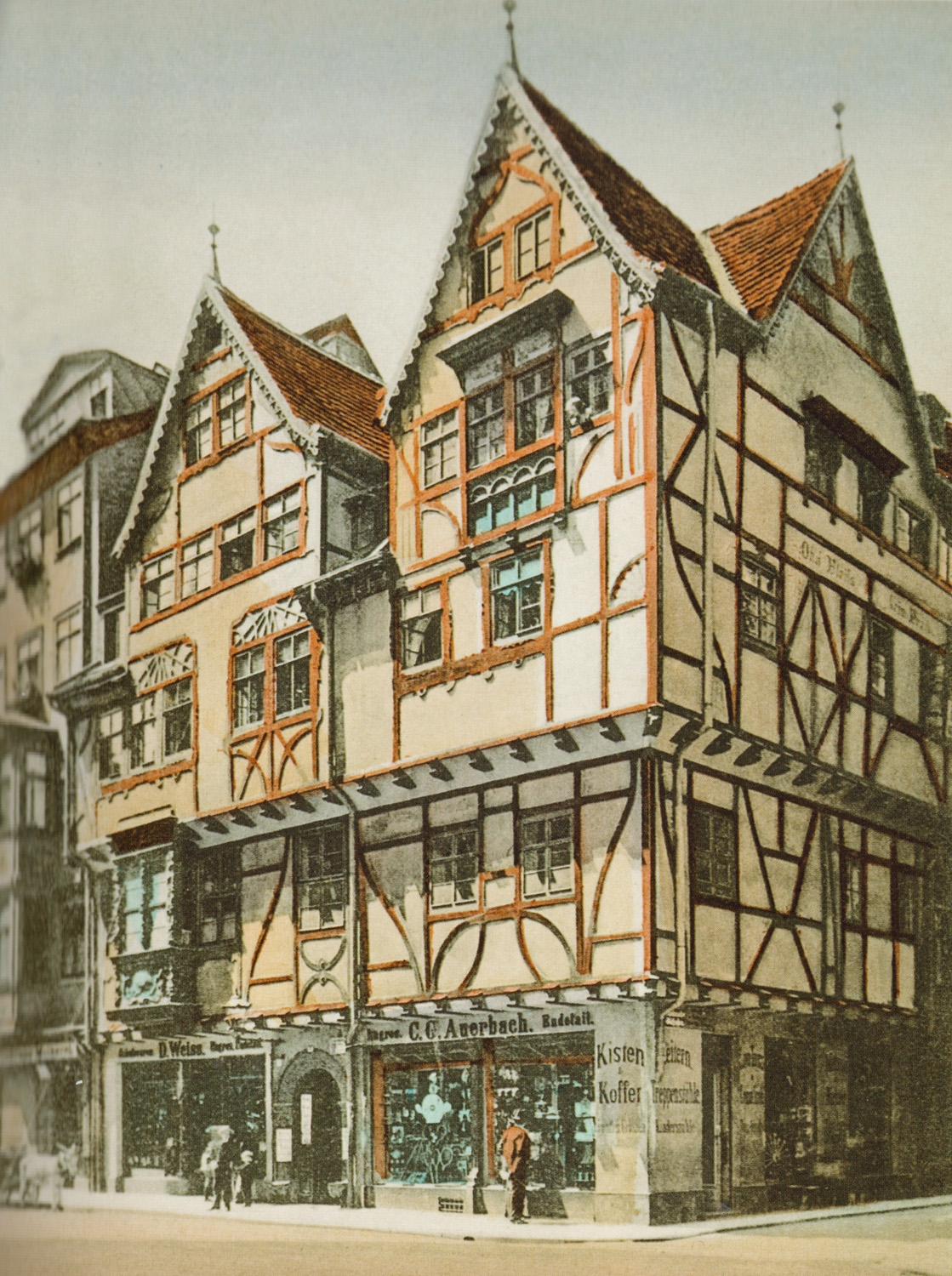
A predecessor building on Nikolaistrasse – “Nuremberg House” (around 1900)

Since around 1430, there was a large building on the corner of Reichsstrasse and Schuhmachergäßchen that served as a residence, brewpub and wine cellar. The final design of the facade was baroque, although some parts already had large modern windows. The house was bought in 1815 by Maximilian Speck von Sternburg (1776–1856) and was called Specks Hof from then on. The German word Hof means courtyard.

On 16 December 1889, it was auctioned off for inheritance purposes, with Maximilian's son, Alexander Maximilian (1821-1911), buying it and paying off the remaining heirs. In 1890, he sold the building to Karl Gottlieb Scheller, who sold it nine years later to Dr. Johanna Petersmann. The merchant Paul Schmutzler and the architect Emil Franz Hänsel (1870-1943) bought it from her on 15 March 1908.

After the Städtisches Kaufhaus was built as the first trade fair building in 1897 during the transition of the Leipziger Messe to the type of Mustermesse (Exhibition of samples), a construction boom of such buildings and building complexes began in the city. This also affected Specks Hof. Starting on Reichsstrasse, the first construction phase of the current building with 5,000 m^{2} (53,819.6 sq ft) of exhibition space was built according to plans. After purchasing and demolishing the buildings facing Nikolaistrasse - including the so-called "Nuremberg House" - the second construction phase was completed in 1911. In 1928, the third construction phase followed on the property at Nikolaistrasse 3, opposite St. Nicholas Church. This was built in the Art Deco style, deviating from the Art Nouveau style of the first phases. An additional floor of the section, which already extended beyond the rest of the building, was prevented by the objection of the St. Nicholas parish. With 10,000 m^{2} (107,639.1 sq ft) of exhibition space, Specks Hof was now the largest trade fair building in the city.

During the Second World War, the building complex was badly damaged in an air raid on 4 December 1943, and lost its roof structures. Reconstruction began in 1947 and lasted until 1960. The trade fair building was now available to the leather, haberdashery and jewellery industries. In 1981/1982, the passage area was renovated. The Leipzig painters Heinz-Jürgen Böhme and Detlef Lieffertz (* 1949) recreated the trade scenes in atrium C, which were created in 1927 by Otto Josef Olbers and Theodor Illing and destroyed in the war.

This work was lost during the extensive restoration of the building from 1993 to 1995, when atrium C was enlarged. During this restoration, the building's original roof landscape was also restored and most of the artistic decorations of the atriums were created. Initially, the historic passages were to be removed, but resistance from the population and monument conservationists ultimately led to the compromise of preserving the passages and one atrium and enlarging two atriums. This restoration, carried out by the Düsseldorf-based architectural firm RKW, won the prize for the most beautiful refurbished office building of the year at the world's largest real estate fair MIPIM in Cannes in 1996.

== Spherical panoramas of the atria ==
Atrium A (2022) (view as a 360° interactive panorama)

Atrium B (2022) (view as a 360° interactive panorama)

Atrium C (2022) (view as a 360° interactive panorama)

== Bibliography ==
- Wolfgang Hocquél: Specks Hof. In: Die Leipziger Passagen & Höfe. Architektur von europäischem Rang. Sax-Verlag Beucha • Markkleeberg 2011, ISBN 978-3-86729-087-6, S. 36–41 und 133
- Riedel, Horst (2005). Stadtlexikon Leipzig von A bis Z (in German). Leipzig: Pro Leipzig. p. 556f. ISBN 3-936508-03-8.
- Leipzig building records archive. “Specks Hof” building records volume 1. (Bauaktenarchiv Leipzig. Bauakte „Specks Hof“ Band 1.)
- Paul Schmutzler: Fünfundzwanzig Messen in Specks Hof zu Leipzig. Leipzig 1922.
