= Bron (disambiguation) =

Bron is a town in France.

Bron may also refer to:

== Arts and media ==
=== Fictional characters ===
- Bron (comics), a character in the comic book Scion
- Bron, a character in The Patterns of Chaos by Colin Kapp
- Bron, a character in The Land Before Time series

=== TV ===
- The Bridge (Scandinavian TV series), or Bron (2011–2018)

== Companies ==
- Bron Elektronik, a Swiss manufacturer of flash equipment for photography
- Bron Studios, a former Canadian film and television production company (2010–2023)

== People ==
- Bron (surname)
- Bron Taylor (born 1955), American professor and conservationist

== Other uses ==
- Bron (cant), a language spoken by some merchants and craftsmen in parts of Spain and France

== See also ==
- Bisphosphonate-associated osteonecrosis of the jaw or BRONJ, a complication of certain dental procedures for patients on bisphosphonate therapy
- Bron-Yr-Aur, a house in Gwynedd, Wales
- Bronn (disambiguation)
- Bronny James, American basketball player and son of LeBron
- Brons
- LeBron James, American basketball player
