= Leibniz Institute for the History and Culture of Eastern Europe =

German research institute

Leibniz Institute for the History and Culture of Eastern Europe (GWZO)
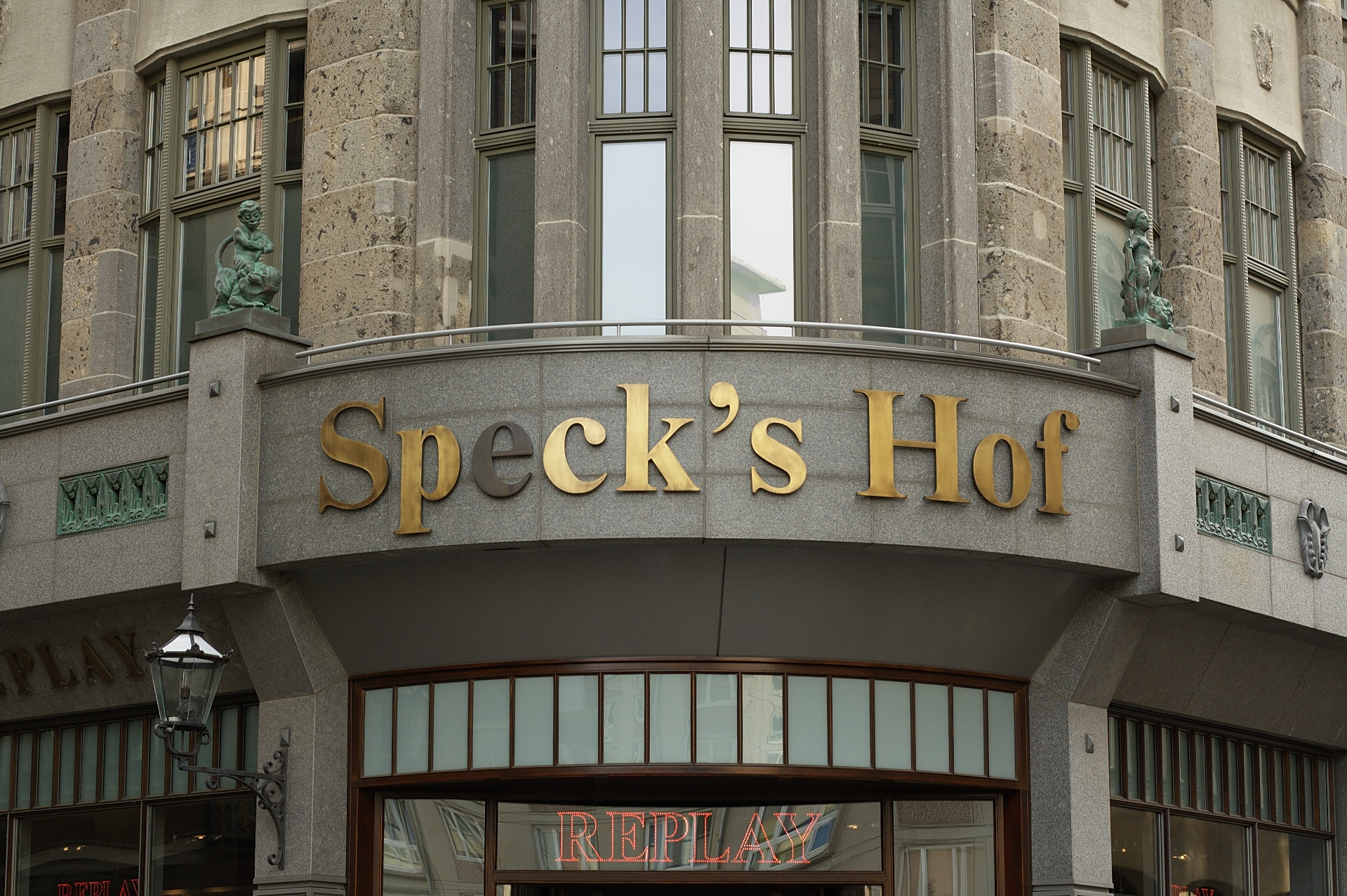
- Abbreviation: GWZO
- Formation: 1995
- Type: non-profit research organization
- Legal status: Eingetragener Verein
- Headquarters: Leipzig, Germany
- Official language: German
- Director: Prof. Dr. Maren Röger
- Staff: approximately 50
- Website: www.leibniz-gwzo.de

The Leibniz Institute for the History and Culture of Eastern Europe (GWZO) (German: Leibniz-Institut für Geschichte und Kultur des östlichen Europa), headquartered in Leipzig, is an interdisciplinary, internationally-oriented research institute of Eastern and Central Europe. Its main focus lies on the scientific study of the history and culture of the region bounded by the Baltic Sea, Black Sea, and Adriatic Sea from the Early Middle Ages to the present in a comparative perspective. The institute aims at contributing to a deeper understanding of the current political, economic and social developments in the countries, societies and cultures of Eastern Europe, especially the countries of East Central Europe. It is a member of the Leibniz Association.

== Interdisciplinarity ==
The approximately 50 scientists from Germany and abroad currently associated with the institute represent various disciplines of the humanities, including archeology, history, art history and literary studies.

== Cooperation ==
The GWZO has a dense network of cooperative relationships with research facilities in Eastern Europe, other parts of Europe, and overseas. For example, there is close cooperation with the National Gallery in Prague, the Willy Brandt Center for German and European Studies, and the Czech Academy of Sciences.

== History ==
During the dissolution of the Academy of Sciences of the GDR in 1991, the German Council of Science and Humanities recommended to continue some of the academic research in the humanities in the form of "research centres for the humanities". On this basis, the "Humanities Centre History and Culture of East-Central Europe" (Geisteswissenschaftliches Zentrum Ostmitteleuropa, thus GWZO) was founded on 30 October 1995 as a non-profit registered association and began its work in January 1996. The German historian Winfried Eberhard was appointed as founding director. Since 2003, it has been affiliated with, although not an administrative part of the University of Leipzig (being a so-called An-Institut). In 2010, the Institute moved from its location in suburban Lindenau to new premises right in the city centre, in the early 20th century shopping arcade Specks Hof.

The GWZO has been a member of the Leibniz Association since January 1, 2017. Since then, the name of the institute has been the "Leibniz Institute for the History and Culture of Eastern Europe". The established abbreviation GWZO has been kept.

== Publications ==
The German-English series "Armenier im östlichen Europa – Armenians in Eastern Europe" has been published in five volumes.

In several volumes, handbook bundles like the heavily illustrated “Handbuch zur Geschichte der Kunst in Ostmitteleuropa (Volume 1: „Vom spätantiken Erbe zu den Anfängen der Romanik (400–1000)”) were created that were suitable for both a specialist audience and readers interested in the research results of the GWZO.

== Exhibitions ==
The German-Czech-Polish exhibition project Europa Jagellonica presented the art and culture of Central Europe at the turn of the Late Middle Ages to the early modern period, grouped around the transnational Jagiellon dynasty. It was jointly organized by four art museums and the GWZO in 2012/2013 and successfully shown in the cities of Kutná Hora, Warsaw and Potsdam.

At the first Bavarian-Czech National Exhibition, in 2016/2017, the institute was involved together with the National Gallery in Prague, the Haus der Bayerischen Geschichte in Augsburg and the Germanisches Nationalmuseum in Nuremberg in creating the exhibit Kaiser Karl IV. 1316-2016 on the occasion of the 700th Birthday of Charles IV.

With Die Leichtigkeit des Haiku - Der Künstler Karel Trinkewitz (The lightness of the haiku - The artist Karel Trinkewitz), the institute presented its first digital exhibition in 2017.

== See also ==
- Leibniz Association
- Central Europe
- EpiMedDat database on medieval epidemics
