= Mustermesse Basel =

Coordinates: 47°33′55″N 7°36′5″E

- Status: Defunct
- Genre: Sample fair (Mustermesse)
- Location: Basel
- Inaugurated: 1917
- Most recent: 2019
- Website: www.muba24.ch

The Mustermesse Basel (short "muba") was a fair in the city of Basel, Switzerland, named after the Mustermesse (in English: Sample fair) concept. The first fair took place in 1917, and the latest fair took place in 2019.

== History ==
The first fair was a demonstration of the industrial development of Switzerland and opened on April, 14 1917. It had 831 exhibitors spread out over 6,000 square meters, and exceeded expectations by hosting over 300,000 visitors.

In 1923, it was the site of a fire that completely destroyed the halls of the Mustermesse. Even before the fire, an architectural competition had been held to replace the provisional halls. Two new halls were built two years later.

The number of visitors increased rapidly over the years following the fire. In 1966, it had more than 1,000,000 visitors.

2019 Mustermesse Basel
- Date: 9 Feb. 2019 - 17 Feb. 2019
- Participants: 236,619 visitors; 261 exhibitors
- Area: 132,000 m^{2} (1,420,000 sq ft)

== Information and data ==
The fair provided a space for various companies to show and advertise their products.

The fair was normally held in the spring.

In 2019 the fair had 236,619 visitors and 261 exhibits spread out over 132,000 square meters. Admission was free, which contributed to the high number of visitors.

== Gallery ==
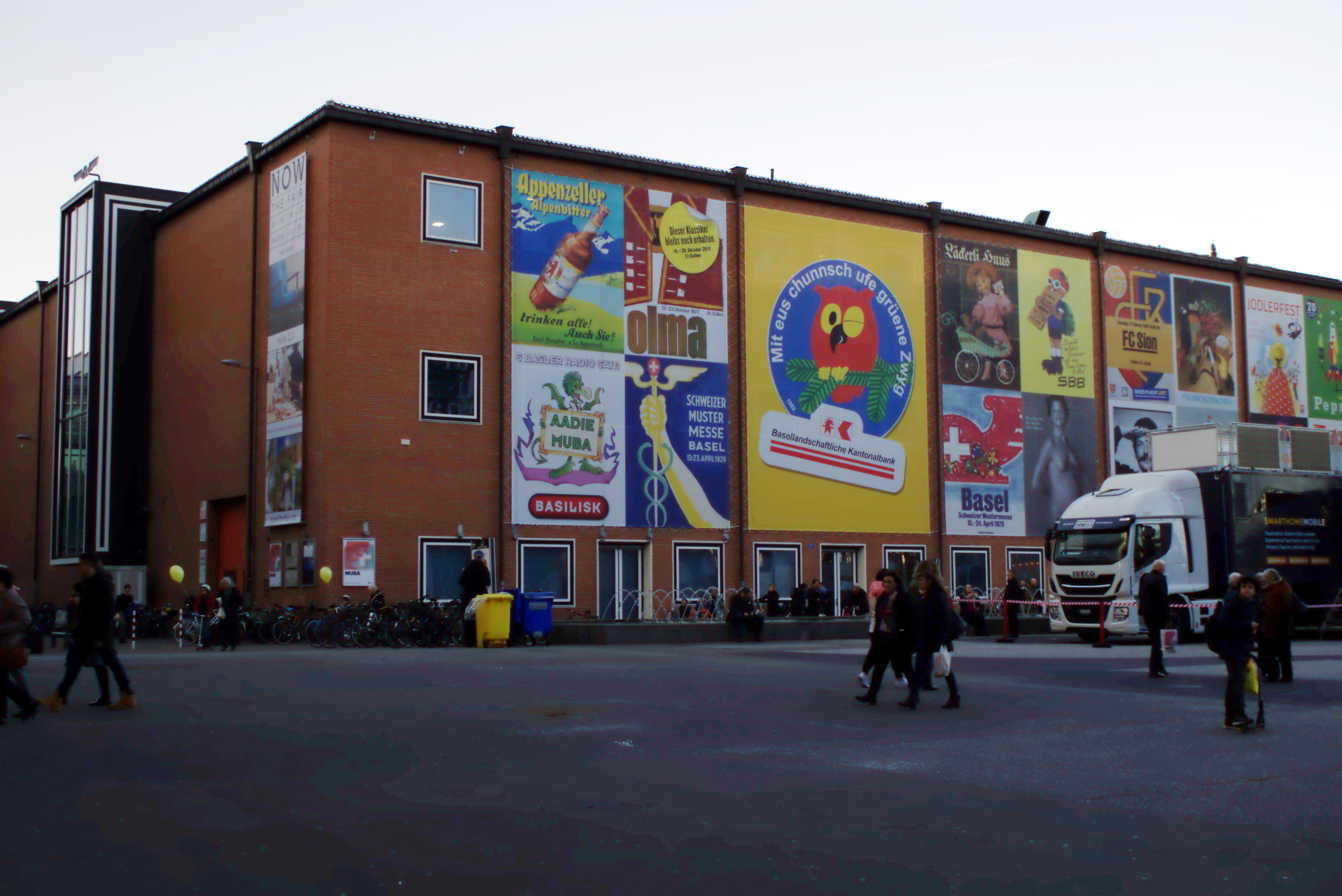
Posters on the wall of hall two

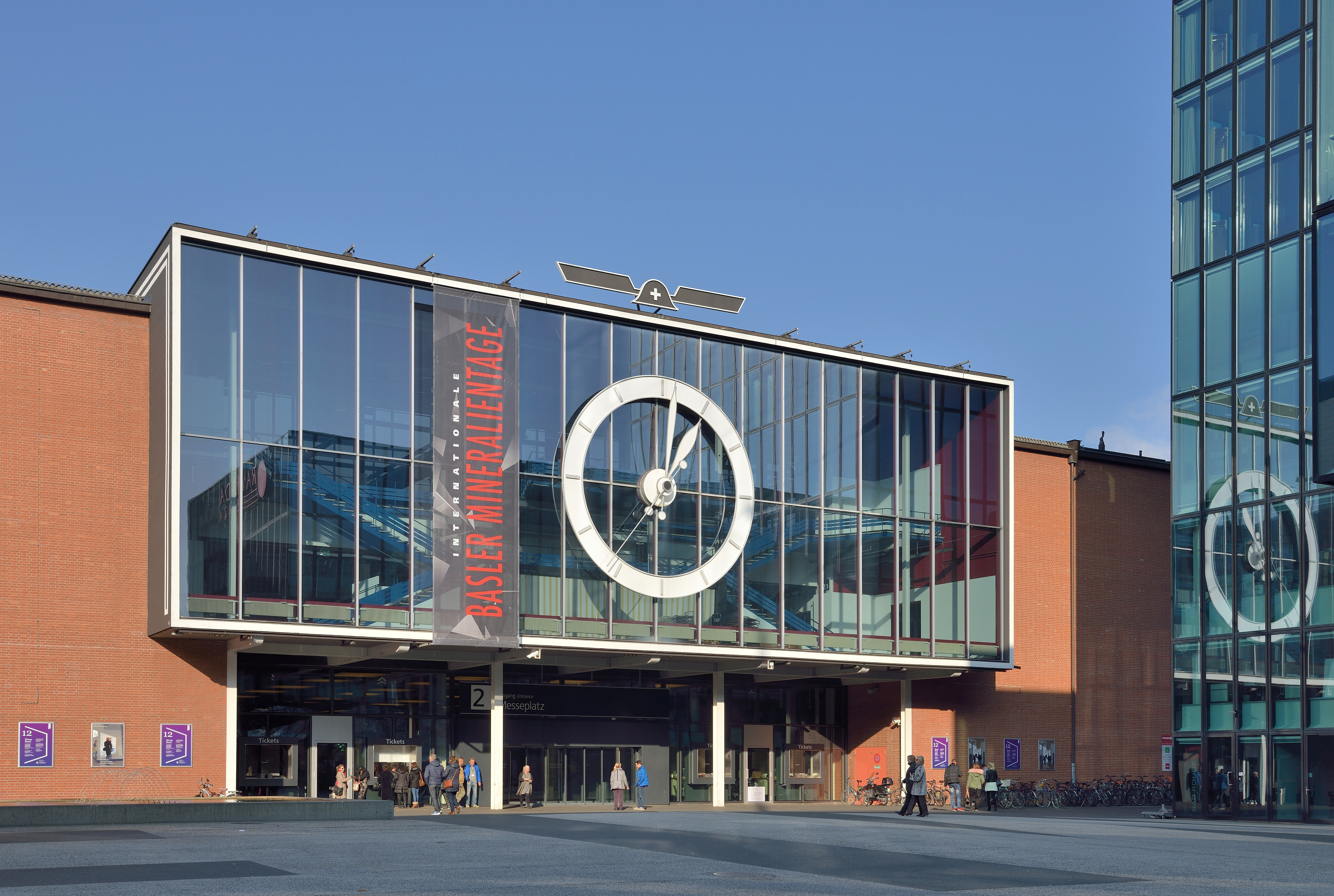
The clock of hall two

The fair 1954

1946

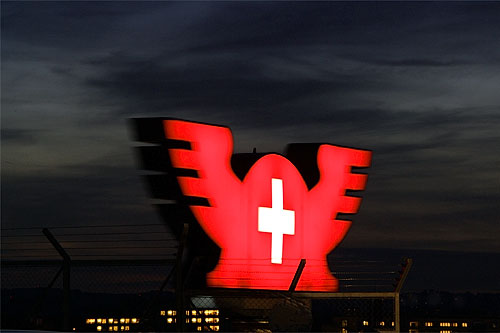
The old symbol on the roof

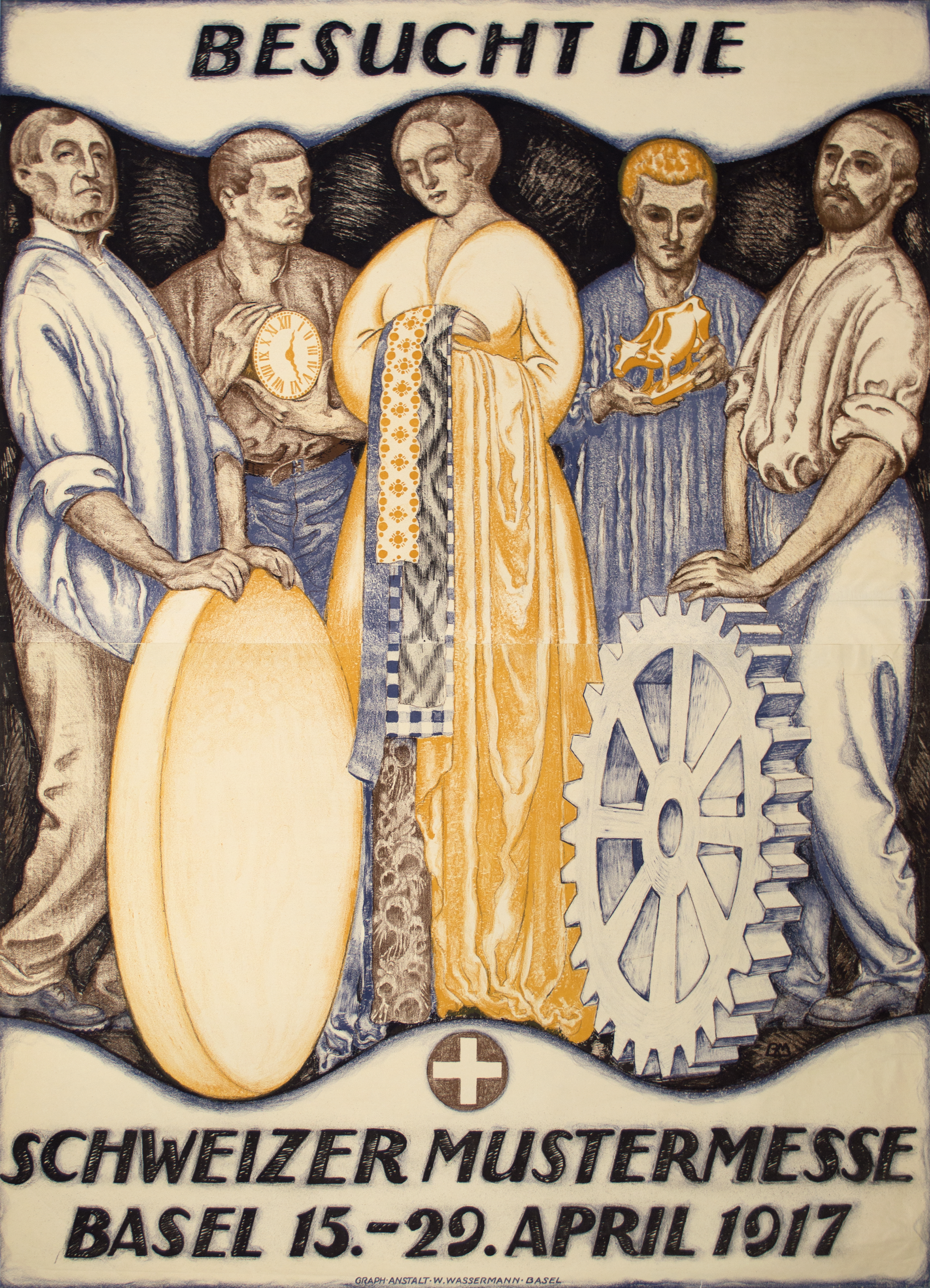
Poster of 1917 from Burkhard Mangold

Poster of 1922 from Robert Stöcklin

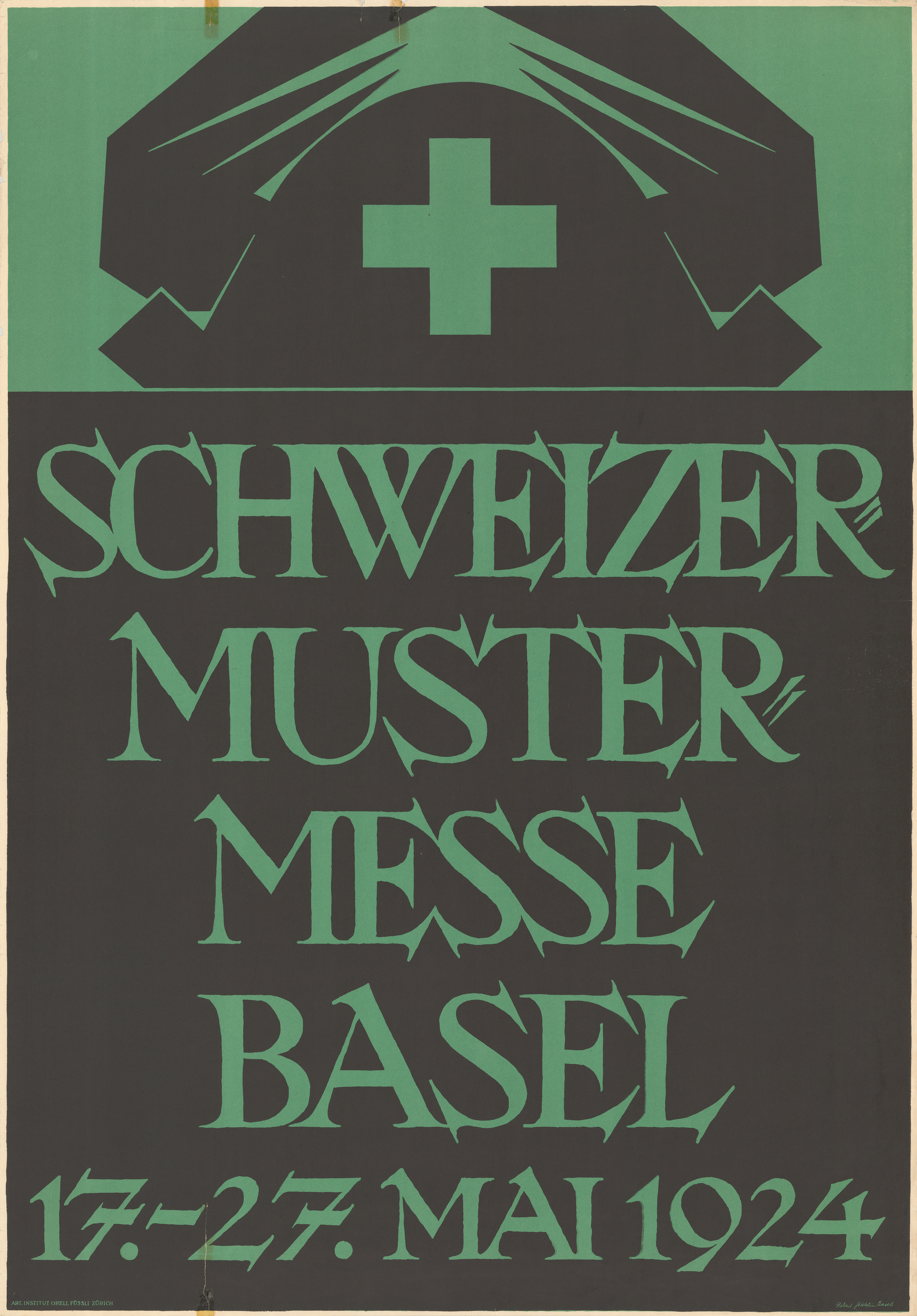
Poster of 1924 from Robert Stöcklin

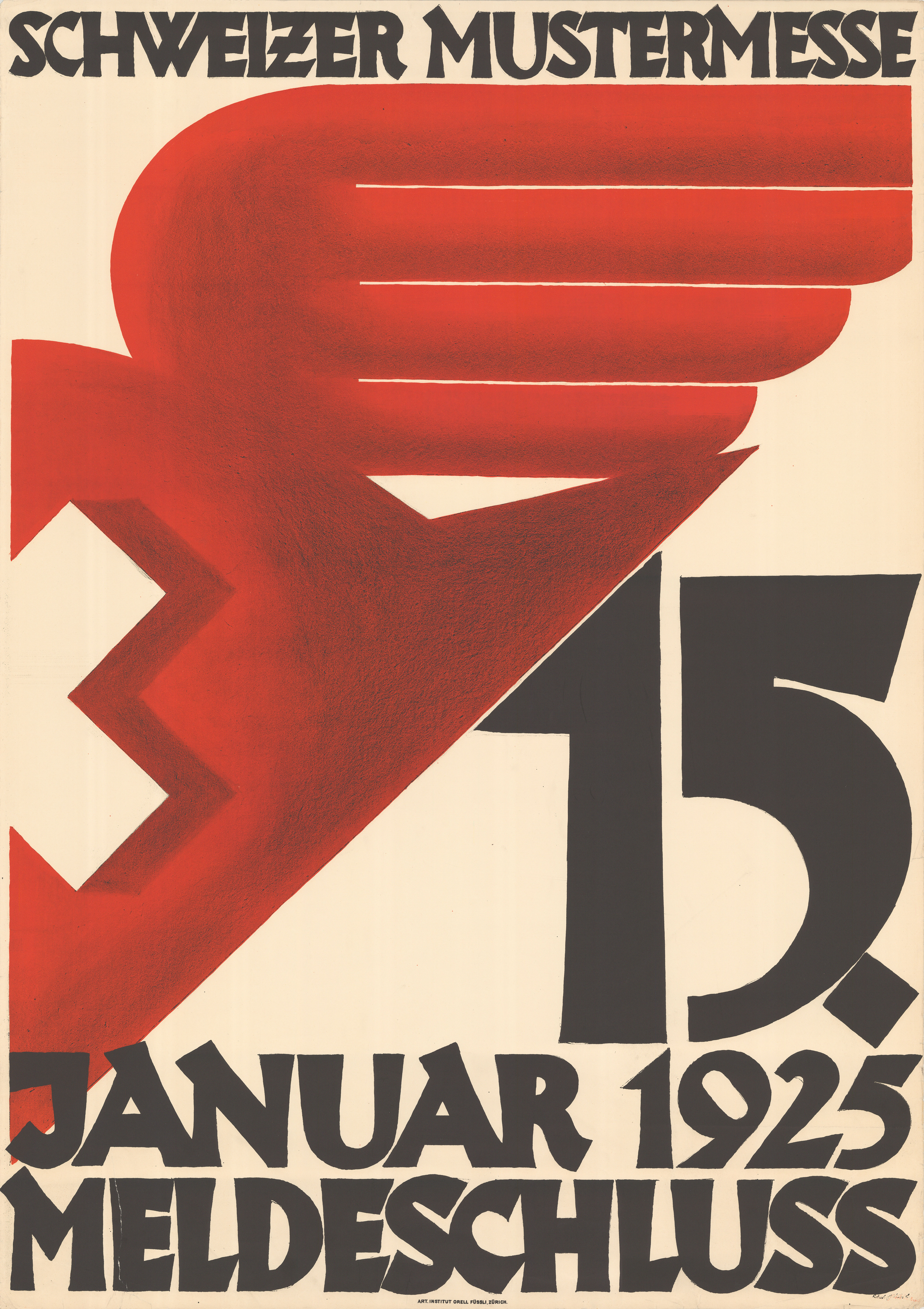
Poster of 1925 from Robert Stöcklin

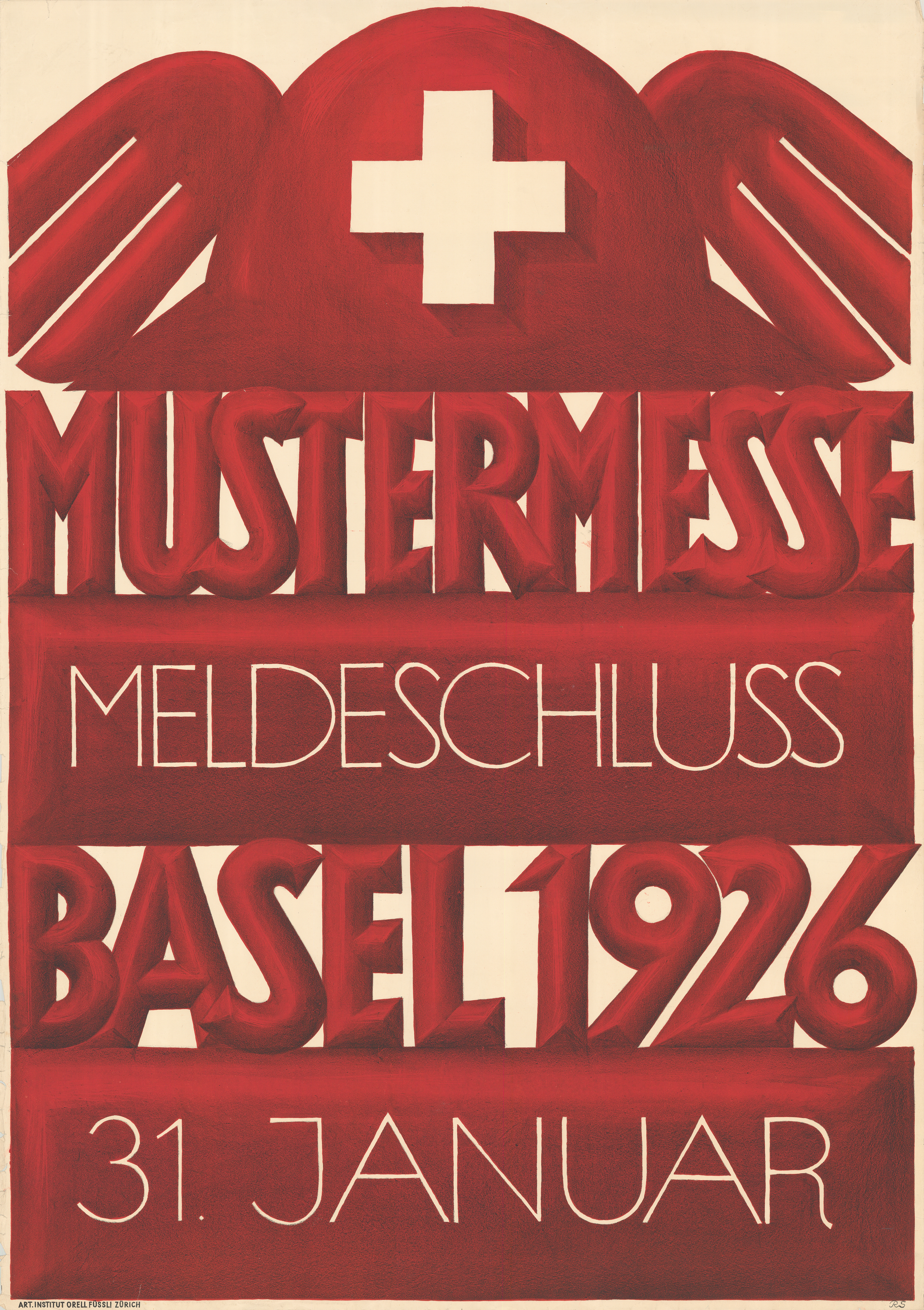
Poster of 1926 from Robert Stöcklin

Poster of 1965 from Blaise Bron

Poster of 1968 from Blaise Bron

Poster of 1974 from Blaise Bron
