= Bron (surname) =

Bron (from Dutch for "source, spring") is a surname. Notable people with the surname include:

- Bas Bron (born 1974), Dutch musician
- Blaise Bron (1918–2004), Swiss artist
- Coenraad Bron (1937–2006), Dutch computer scientist
- Eleanor Bron (born 1938), British actress and author
- Gerry Bron (1933–2012), British record producer
- Jean-Stéphane Bron (born 1969), Swiss film director
- Kenneth Bron (Kenny B, born 1961), Surinamese-born singer
- Saul Bron (1887–1978), Soviet trade representative in United States and Great Britain
- Zakhar Bron (born 1947), Russian violinist
