= Bronn =

Bronn may refer to:

- Gwenn Teir Bronn, figure in Welsh mythology
- Heinrich Georg Bronn (1800-1862), German geologist and paleontologist
- Bronn (character), character in the epic fantasy novels A Song of Ice and Fire and the television series Game of Thrones based upon it
- Broons (by Breton name), town and commune in France

== See also ==
- Bron (disambiguation)
