= Moritz Götze =

German artist, publisher and art collector

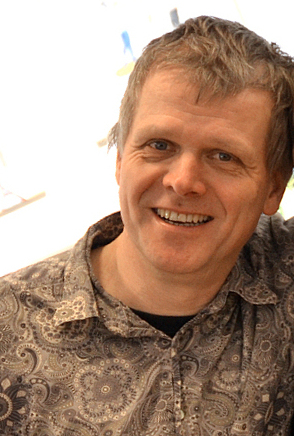
- Götze in 2018
- Born: 26 July 1964 (age 62); Halle, East Germany
- Occupations: Artist, publisher, art collector

Moritz Götze (born 26 July 1964 in Halle, East Germany) is a German artist, publisher and art collector. His oeuvre comprises paintings, silkscreen prints, enamel paintings and mosaics, graphics and sculptures.

== Biography ==
Moritz Götze is the son of Wasja and Inge Götze. His father Wasja was one artists of the counter-culture movement in East Germany. Moritz Götze grew up in Halle. In the 1980s he worked as carpenter, singer and guitar player in punk bands and organized punk festivals, as the East German authorities had blocked his development as an artist. Between 1985 and 1995 he ran a workshop, in which he produced posters and silkscreen prints. He held an academic appointment as a lecturer at the University of Art and Design Halle in 1991-194 and was a visiting scholar at the École Nationale Supérieure des Beaux-Arts in Paris in 1994. Götze works with his spouse and fellow artist Grita Götze in Halle, where he curates exhibitions, supports young musicians and is involved in heritage conservation. Together with Peter Gerlach and Simone Trieder he founded in 2006 the publishing house Hasenverlag in Halle/Saale, which specializes in art books and the cultural history of the region.

== Work ==
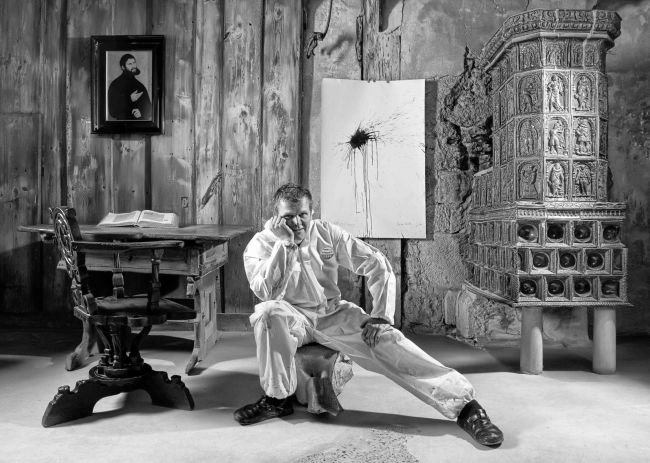
Moritz Götze

Since 1990 Götze has produced large-format art works for public buildings and churches as well as sculptures. He produced multi-piece silkscreens and murals in enamel e.g. for the Federal Ministry for Economics and Labour in Berlin and the employment office in Halle. In 1995 he embellished the five-storey atrium of the Leipzig trade-fair building with a series of large-format images depicting the history of the Leipzig trade-fair.

Götze's large-format works in the artist's hallmark pop-art style often deal with watershed moments in history, historic figures and the state of the German society. In 2006/07 Götze produced the 700 piece enamel composition Victoria. In 2012-2016 he decorated the interior of the Baroque castle church St. Giles in Bernburg, Saxony-Anhalt with enamel sheet steel plates.

Götze's art works are his take on German history and with that he follows in the tradition of Arnold Böcklin, Franz von Stuck, Jörg Immenhoff, Anselm Kiefer, – characterized by his life in two Germanys. His works are playful, ambiguous, ironic and visually narrative.

Together with his fellow-artist from Halle, Rüdiger Giebler, Götze is taking his art on a tour to four continents: Giebler & Götze. Grand Tour. Made in Kaisersaschern. The title refers to a fictitious setting in the Thomas Mann novel Dr. Faustus.

== Selected works ==
Silkscreen print

- 1987 : Eine Reise nach Ägypten série de sérigraphie, 6 parts
- 1989 : James Bond 007, Siebdruckmappe
- 1990 : All die toten Albaner meines Surfbretts, en coopération avec Matthias "Baader"-Holst
- 1990 : Je t'aime, Siebdruckmappe
- 1991 : Nibelungen, Siebdruckmappe
- 1991 : Der Prinzenraub, Siebdruckmappe
- 1992 : Was man alles braucht, Siebdruckmappe
- 1993-1994 : Tristan und Isolde, Siebdruckmappe
- 1995 : The little Dog, en 9 éléments, 210 x 300 cm

Paintings

- 1984 : Propagandaztanze, Öl auf Leinwand
- 1988 : Scapa Flow, Öl auf HF

• 1990 : Der Stuhl, Acryl auf Leinwand • 1991 : Prinz, Acryl auf Leinwand • 1992 : Schlafende, Acryl auf Leinwand • 1992 : Eine Melodie, Buntstift auf Bütten • 1993 : 7 Pf., Buntstift auf Bütten • 1994 : a.b.c., Acryl auf Leinwand • 1994 : Ein neuer Kontinent, Buntstift auf Bütten • 1998 : Nachts, Acryl auf Leinwand • 1998 : Die Entscheidung, Acryl auf Leinwand • 1997 : Das Wochenende, Buntstift • 2002 : Wo die Sonne aufgeht, Öl auf Leinwand • 2002 : Der Durchmarsch, Öl auf Leinwand • 2002 : Am Schaltpult. Nach Willi Sitte, Öl auf Leinwand • 2003 : Parteidiskussion. Nach Willi Neubert, Öl auf Leinwand • 2005 : Im Zimmer, Öl auf Leinwand

Enamel

- 1996 : Orlando, Emailschild
- 1998 : Mono, Emailschild
- 1999 : Seewasserdose, Emailschild

Large-format enamels and mosaics

• 1994 : Mosaics, Ceramics, Leipzig, Messehaus, Specks Hof. • 1995 : It's a new day, Murals on Prisma walls • 2000 : Mural, enamel, Berlin, Federal Ministry for Economics and Technology • 2001 : Mural, enamel, Halle, Arbeitsamt • 2006 : Victoria, large-format enamel composition in 700 parts

Books and Illustrations

- 1999 : Manfred Krug: 66 Gedichte - was soll das, Gestaltung und Illustrationen. ISBN 3-43015731-5.
- 1999 : Halle um die Jahrhundertwende - Fotografien von Fritz Möller, Gestaltung. ISBN 3-7492-0260-5.
