= Städtisches Kaufhaus =

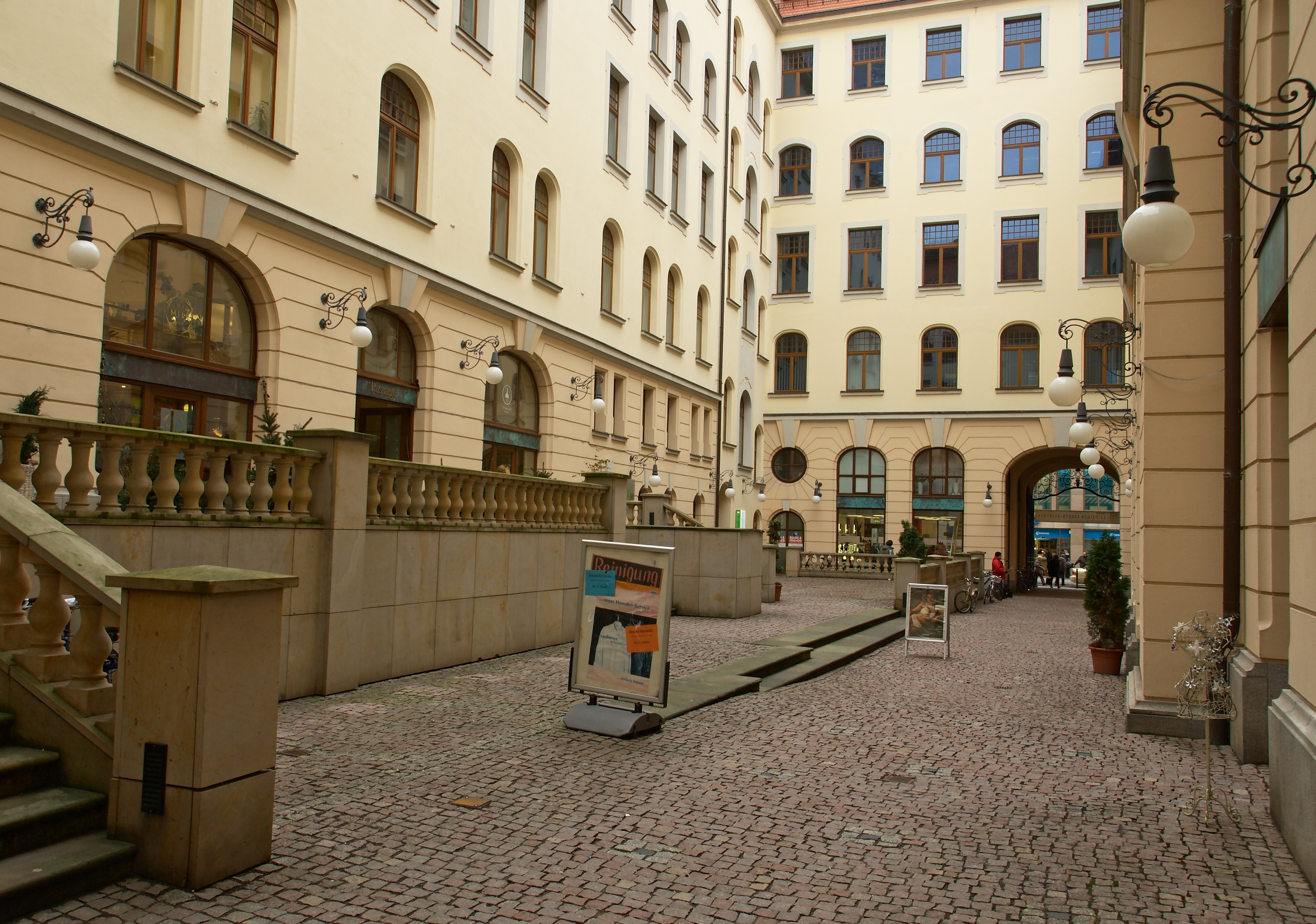
- Städtisches Kaufhaus, courtyard
- Interactive map of the Städtisches Kaufhaus area

General information
- Type: Trade court building
- Architectural style: Baroque Revival architecture
- Location: Neumarkt 9-19, Leipzig, Germany
- Coordinates: 51.338492°N 12.376978°E
- Construction started: 1893
- Completed: 1901
- Renovated: 1993-1996
- Cost: 45 millions EUR in the 1990s
- Client: Fundus Gruppe
- Owner: Real Estate Investment Partner Reinvest Asset Management S.A., Luxembourg City

Technical details
- Floor count: 6
- Floor area: 22,000 m^{2}

Design and construction
- Architects: Leipzig municipal architects Rayher, Korber and Müller

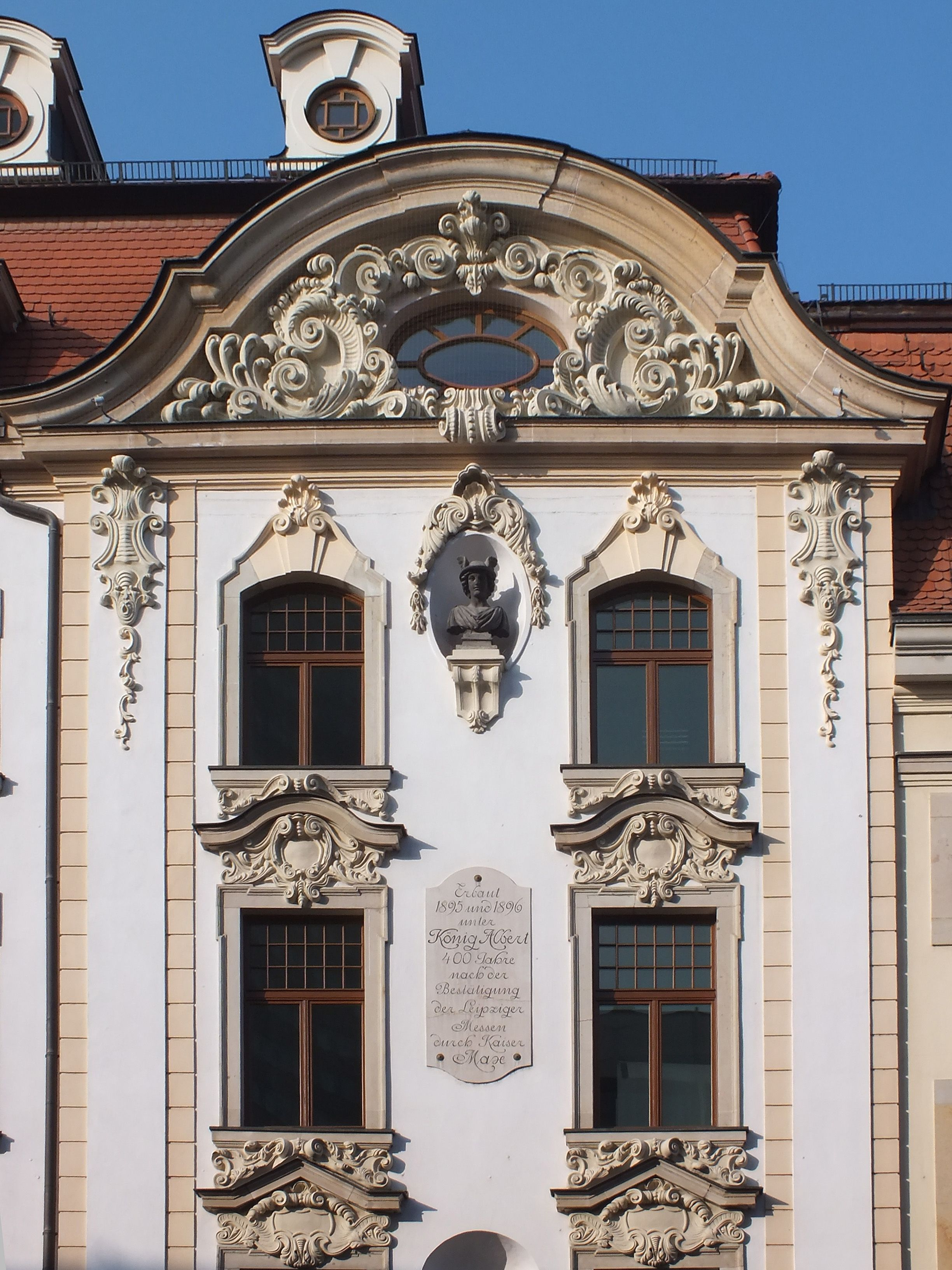
Part of the facade

The Städtisches Kaufhaus in Leipzig, designed by the municipal architects Rayher, Korber and Müller in the style of Baroque Revival architecture, was constructed from 1894 to 1901.

== Site history prior to Städtisches Kaufhaus ==
This piece of land and architectural monument reflects 500 years of Leipzig's inner city's history of trading and culture. From 1477 to 1498, the first Gewandhaus ("cloth-house") was constructed there at the Gewandgässchen and Universitätsstrasse. Due to the imperial fair privilege from 1497, Leipzig quickly became important as an emporium. The Gewandhaus was home to foreign cloth merchants and hosted the Zeughaus (armory).

After nearly 250 years of utilisation, the first Gewandhaus was torn down and, from 1740 to 1744, replaced by the municipal library, which was erected elaborately and again hosted an armory (in its east wing). Many parts can still be recognised in today's building. In 1780/1781, the armory was reconstructed into a concert hall, the first permanent home of the Gewandhaus orchestra (Germany's oldest civic orchestra, as opposed to one under royal or aristocratic patronage). Johann Carl Friedrich Dauthe designed the hall. It saw numerous famous concerts, e.g. by Mendelssohn Bartholdy, Mozart and Liszt. Even though the hall's capacity was extended a couple of times, in the long run, it was too small. Hence, the Gewandhaus orchestra in 1884 moved to the newly built Neues Concerthaus (new concert house), home to the orchestra until 1943, when it was destroyed by bombing. After an interim in the congress hall, the Gewandhaus Orchestra's permanent home today is the (third) Gewandhaus, located ON the Augustusplatz.

== History of the Städtisches Kaufhaus ==
As the Leipzig trade fair changed its focus during the Industrial Revolution in 1893, some storeys of the municipal library were reconstructed to serve as sample fair booths. This concept immediately proved successful, so all other buildings on the site were torn down in 1894. The Städtisches Kaufhaus was then constructed from 1894 to 1901 in three construction stages. The building was the prototype of a specialised sample fair building - a building type prevalent in Leipzig's inner city. Unlike the other sample fair buildings (or fair palaces, as they were called), the Städtisches Kaufhaus assimilates the elaborate manner of the municipal library, which was integrated.

In 1943, the building complex was severely damaged and partly destroyed by aerial bombing. Part of the Städtisches Kaufhaus was reconstructed after World War II during GDR times, but the northern parts remained ruined until the 1980s.

After German reunification, the building was completely reconstructed from 1993 to 1996 with particular attention to monument protection. As Leipzig's Trade Fair Site was newly constructed near the airport, the Städtisches Kaufhaus nowadays is home to offices (some 13,000 m^{2} rental office space), retail outlets and restaurants (some 7,000 m^{2} rental non-office space). In this sense, the name 'municipal store' is even more misleading than ever. The origin of the name is not known. In addition to reconstruction, an underground parking garage and an underground event location have been built.

Touristic attractions are the statue of emperor Maximilian at the Universitätsstraße, the baroque stairway (with memorial badge at the former entrance to the Gewandhaus orchestra hall), Leipzig's oldest conserved elevator and the 'Straße der Stars', a walk of fame-like exhibition of hand imprints of prominent people (e. g. Mariah Carey, Max Schmeling, Hans Dietrich Genscher) in the courtyard.

== See also ==
- List of arcade galleries in Leipzig
