= Sample fair =

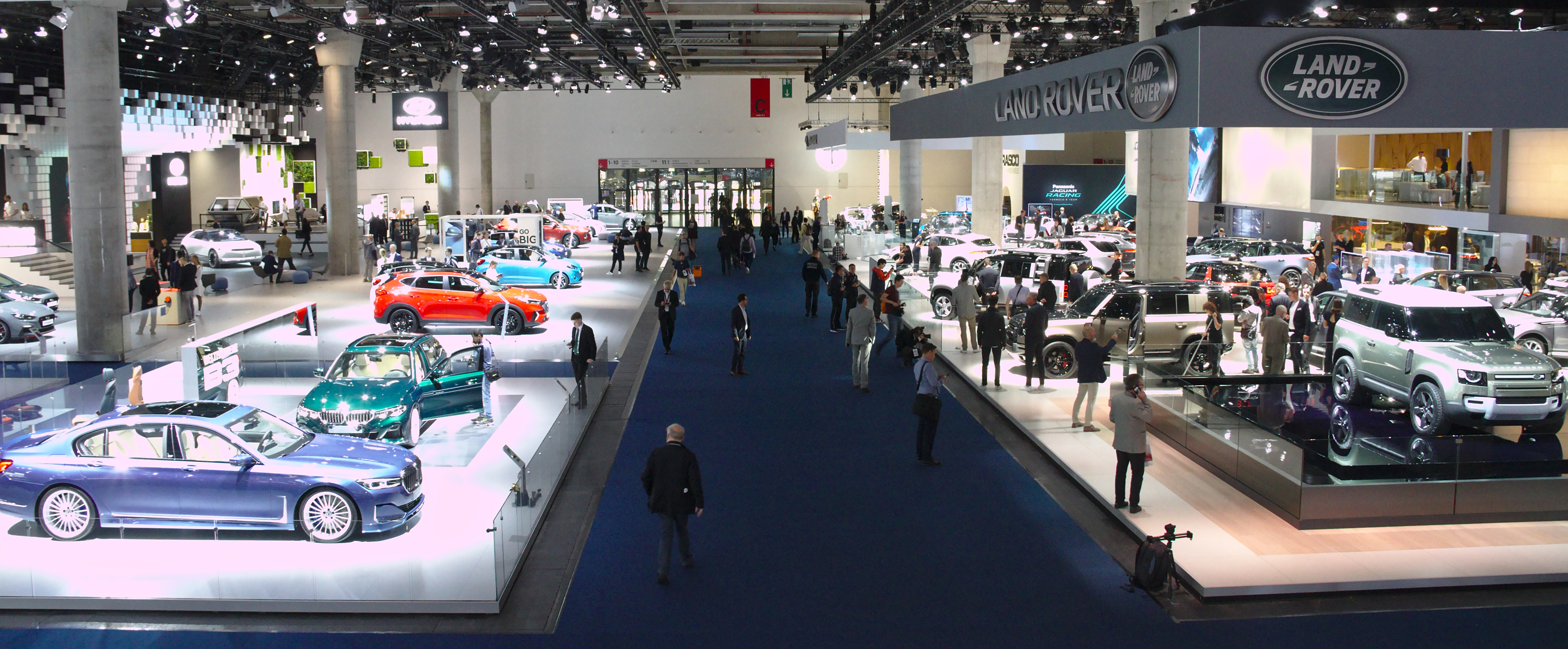
View of a modern sample fair in Hall 11 at the IAA 2019

The concept of the sample fair (in German: Mustermesse) was invented in 1895 in Leipzig, Germany. At the Leipzig Trade Fair the traditional goods fair was replaced with sample shows. The sample fairs are the usual type of trade fair today, which is facing another paradigm shift due to the digital transformation, accelerated by the COVID-19 pandemic.

== History ==
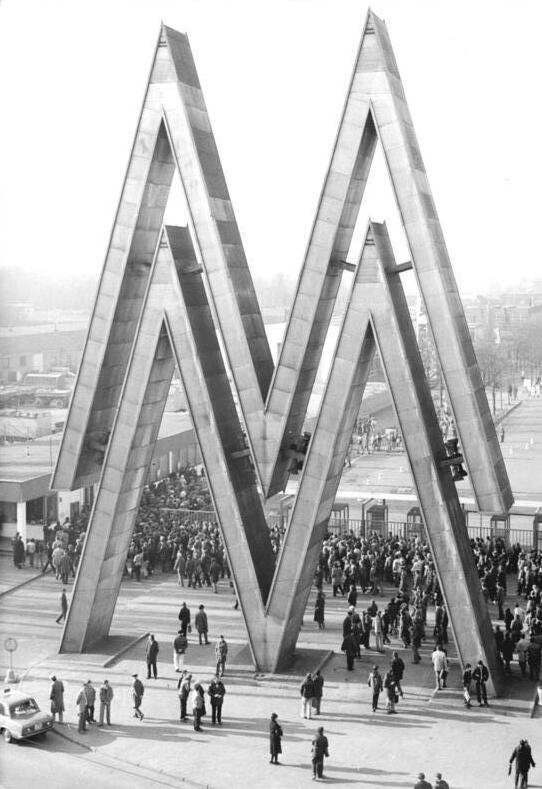
The double M as the abbreviation of the German word Mustermesse became the logo of the trade fair in Leipzig, created by Erich Gruner, here as an oversized entrance gate on the exhibition grounds (photo from 1983).

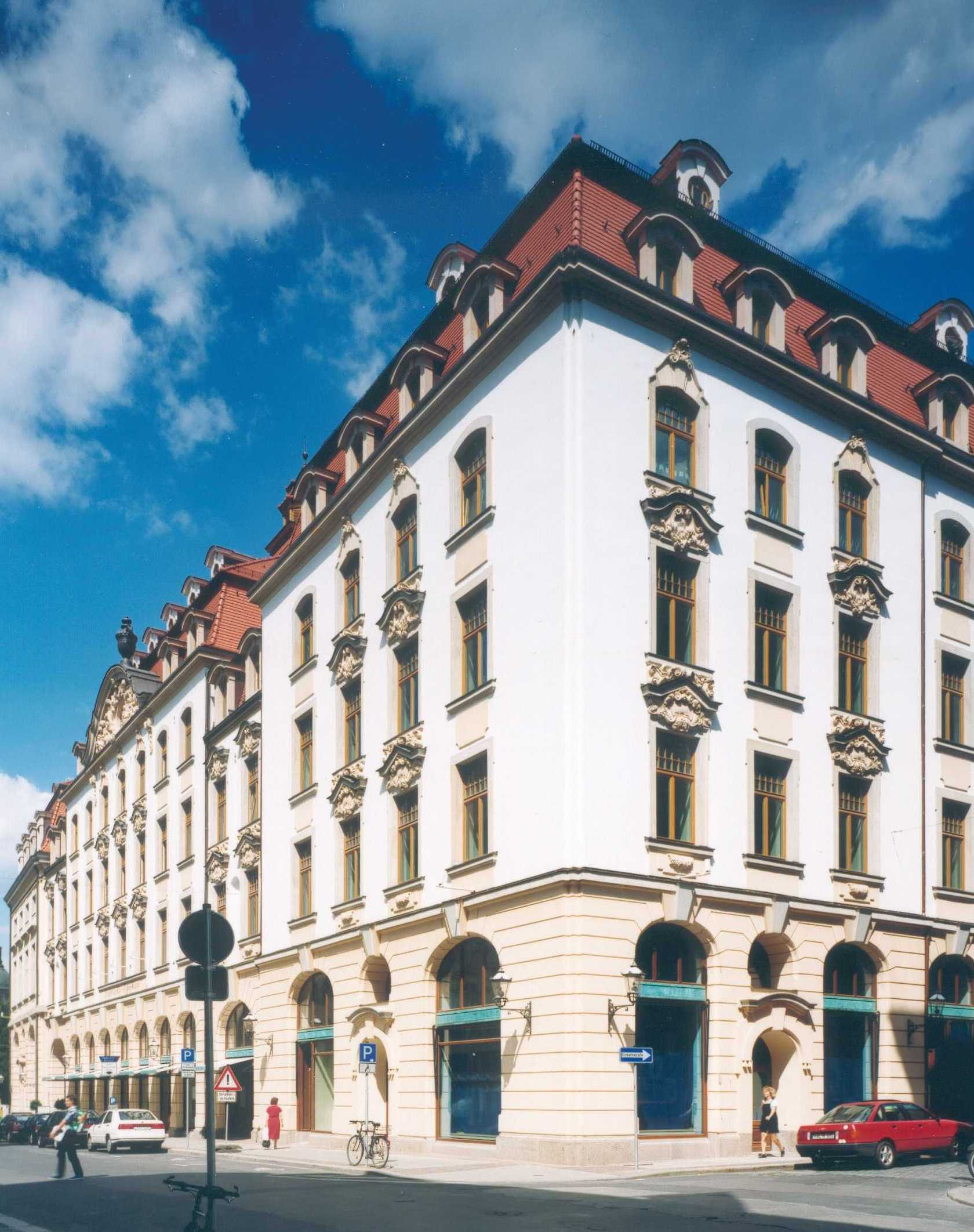
Southwest view of the Städtisches Kaufhaus in Leipzig

Since the beginning of European trade fair history in France in the 7th century, trade fairs have been held as goods fairs. This meant that the merchant took his "goods to be traded" to the respective trade fair location in order to present and sell them there. The Champagne fairs held in the Middle Ages, which were of European importance at the time, also functioned according to this concept.

When regional trade fair networks were formed in the area of what is now Germany in the 12th century, particularly on the two important European trade routes, the Via Regia and the Via Imperii, this concept was adopted. The history of the sample fair is closely linked to the history of the trade fair in the city of Leipzig, which lay at the crossroads of these trade routes. Following its elevation to Imperial Trade Fair City in 1497 (expanded in 1507) through numerous privileges granted by Emperor Maximilian I, it developed into the leading trading centre in Germany. An influential Leipzig merchant bourgeoisie also developed at this point.

At the beginning of the 19th century, it occasionally happened that traders only took samples of their products with them, because the Industrial Revolution that began in the 18th century gave rise to new sales and distribution channels. The goods could suddenly be produced in large quantities, more quickly, in the same style and quality - mail order developed, goods were transported ever faster and the new profession of sales representative emerged. In addition, the founding of the German Reich in 1871 meant that important trade tariffs for cities were no longer applicable. These factors plunged trade fair cities across Europe into a deep crisis. The important Leipzig Trade Fair in particular had to fear for its continued existence, because even the new and revolutionary inventions such as steam engines or rail transport could not be sold in the largely medieval trading courtyards in Leipzig's city center. The imperial trade fair privilege also lost its validity. However, it was possible to profit from this development, because in 1895 the completely new sample fair concept was developed. Merchants now had the opportunity to take a variety of products to the Leipzig Trade Fair, and of each product they only took one corresponding sample, which was then exhibited in the newly built sample fair buildings, a new type of buildings in the architecture of Leipzig. The samples presented could now be examined and tried out in detail by interested parties and were then - as is common today - ordered and delivered. The sample fair, with its wide range of consumer and capital goods, spread worldwide in the 20th century and is still the usual type of trade fair today. As a result of the conversion of the goods fair into the world's first sample fair, Leipzig rose to become a world trading center until the Second World War and after the Battle of Leipzig it became a wealthy bourgeois city again.

“The trade fair enables the greatest business with the least resources, in the shortest time and in the smallest space."

— Edouard Herriot (1872–1957)

GDR traffic sign with trade fair logo (from 1979)

With the conversion to the sample fair concept, Leipzig's city centre underwent a profound transformation from 1894 onwards. Most of the trading and transit courtyards from the Baroque or Renaissance periods were ruthlessly demolished on a large scale. The Städtisches Kaufhaus was the first sample fair building in the world to open in Leipzig's city centre in 1901. It was followed by others such as Specks Hof, the Reichshof or the Mädlerpassage complex. These buildings with particularly large exhibition areas (e.g. 10,000 m^{2} (107,639.1 sq ft) in Specks Hof) are the first models for today's modern exhibition halls. They also introduced the so-called "compulsory tour", in which trade fair visitors had to follow a predetermined exhibition tour and cross the building on all levels. In addition, a completely new area was created on the south-eastern outskirts of the city, the Technische Messe, which together with the city centre formed the main exhibition centre. Due to the enormous success of the Leipzig Trade Fair, especially in the second half of the 1920s, the sample fair developed into a world trade fair concept in the 20th century. After 1945 and the elimination of Leipzig as a direct competitor, other German trade fair locations such as Hanover, Düsseldorf and Cologne were able to develop into increasingly important trading centers. Large exhibition centers were created, such as the exhibition center in Hanover, which is the largest in the world with 496,000 m^{2} (5,338,899.6 sq ft) of covered area. Large trade fair centers also emerged in the Americas and later increasingly in Asia, such as the Las Vegas Convention Center (LVCC) or the National Exhibition and Convention Center in Shanghai.

In the 20th century, the concept of the sample fair became established worldwide, but was ultimately held more and more as a more specialized form of trade fair. The concept of the sample fair is now being called into question by digital transformation and the Covid-19 pandemic.

With the spring fair in March 1991, the history of the classic universal sample fairs also came to an end in Leipzig. Since 1996, specialist sample fairs have also been held at the new Leipzig exhibition grounds.

== Examples of sample fairs ==
- Bauma (trade fair)
- Frankfurt Book Fair
- Leipzig Book Fair
- Farnborough International Airshow
- International Motor Show Germany
- Nuremberg International Toy Fair
- CeBIT until 2018.
- Mustermesse Basel until 2019.

== Bibliography ==
- Wolfgang Hocquél: Die Architektur der Leipziger Messe. Kaufmannshof, Messepalast, Passage, Messegelände. Verlag für Bauwesen, Berlin 1994, ISBN 3-345-00575-1
