= Blaise Bron =

Blaise Etienne Bron
- Born: December 7, 1918; Basel, Switzerland
- Died: September 11, 2004 (aged 85); Lucerne, Switzerland
- Resting place: Lucerne, Switzerland
- Notable work: Mobiloil (1952)
- Style: Pop Art

Blaise Bron (December 7, 1918 – September 11, 2004) was a Swiss graphic designer, industrial designer, exhibition designer, book designer, and photographer. Although he designed only nine posters, he was presented awards for five of them and became known to the public through them.

== Biography ==
Bron was born in Basel, Switzerland. From 1922 to 1938, Bron apprenticed as a typographer at the Frobenius AG in Basel. He then studied a further ten semesters at The Basel School of Design, Basel/Switzerland, specializing in graphic design. Between 1943 and 1945 he worked for the Keller & Co. printing company in Lucerne. In 1948, Bron started his own business and opened his graphic studio.

He died in Lucerne, Switzerland.

== Awards ==
His first recognition as an artist was the selection of his black and white Mobiloil poster in 1951 by the Department of Home Affairs at the awards for the best Swiss posters. The following year, a second award was given to him for his Mobiloil poster in color.

Bron continued his success at the Swiss Industries Fair in 1965, 1968 and 1974. He also won the competition of the General Swiss Post Office for new stamps and was the runner-up in the audience vote in 1970.

One of Bron's color posters from 1952 was auctioned on May 12, 2008, for US$28,800.00 by Swann Galleries, New York. In the catalog for the auction of May 12, 2008, Swann Galleries New York described the poster: "It is impossible to look at this image without seeing a resemblance to Roy Lichtenstein’s early graphic work (and arguably Andy Warhol.) However, this poster precedes Lichtenstein’s first Pop Art creations by nearly ten years…." "This poster is a proto-Pop masterpiece that stands as an exceptional vanguard to the Pop movement of the 1960s." (Swann New York: Catalogue Modernist Posters May 12, 2008)

== Collections ==
Schweizerische Nationalbibliothek, Graphische Sammlung, Bern - Swiss National Library, Graphic Art Collection, Bern/Switzerland) Museum für Gestaltung, Plakatsammlung, Zürich - (The Museum of Design, Poster Collection, Zürich/Switzerland) Schule für Gestaltung, Plakatsammlung, Basel - (The Basel School of Design, Poster collection, Basel/Switzerland) Bibliothèque de Genève - (The Public and University Library Geneva/Switzerland) Akademie der Künste Plakatsammlung, Berlin - (The Berlin Academy of the Arts, Poster Collection, Berlin/Germany)

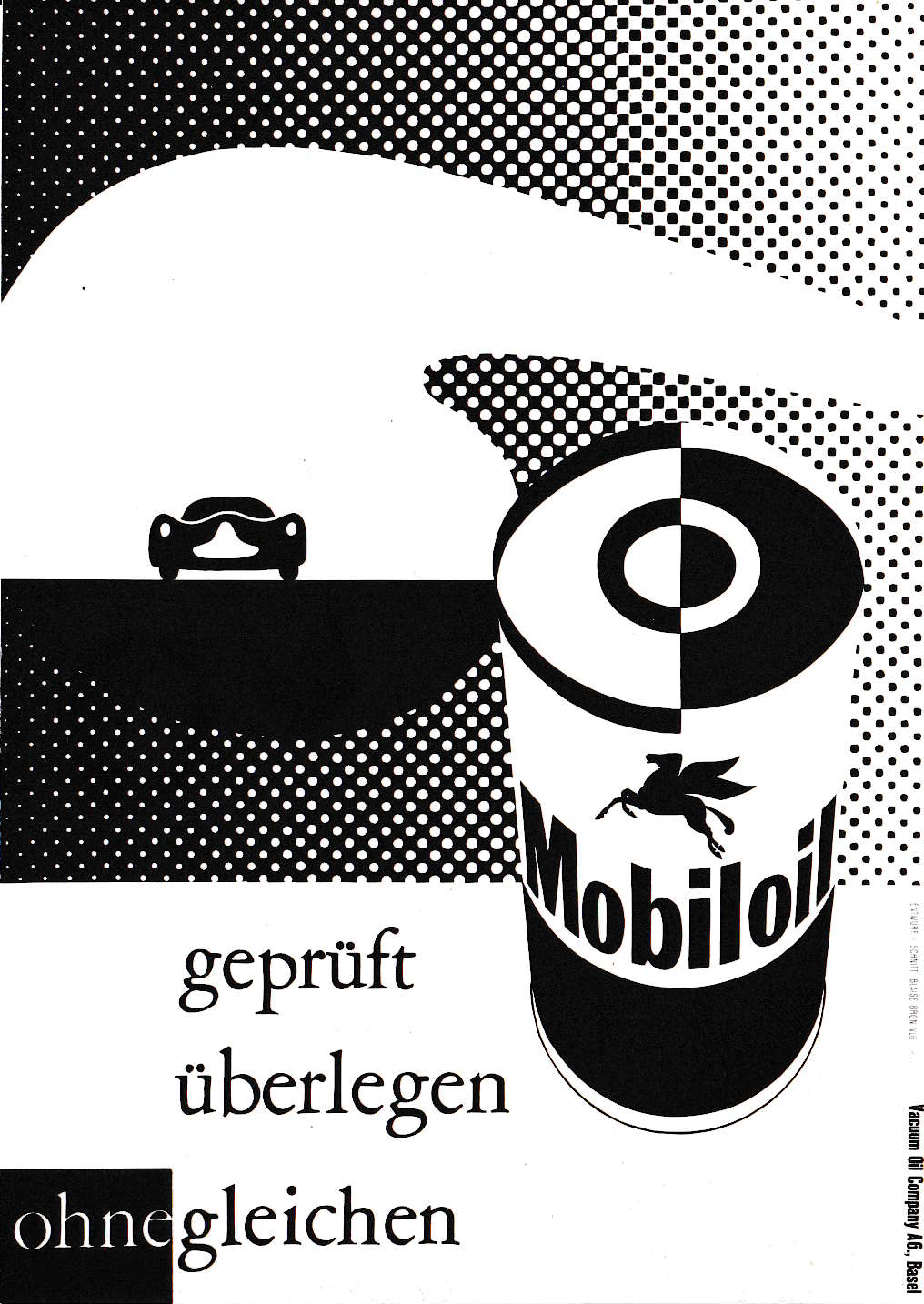
Plakat Mobiloil, 1951

Plakat Mobiloil, 1952

Mustermesse Basel, 1965

Mustermesse Basel, 1968

Mustermesse Basel, 1974
