= Barfußgäßchen =

Street in Leipzig, Germany

Coordinates: 51.340857°N 12.373137°E

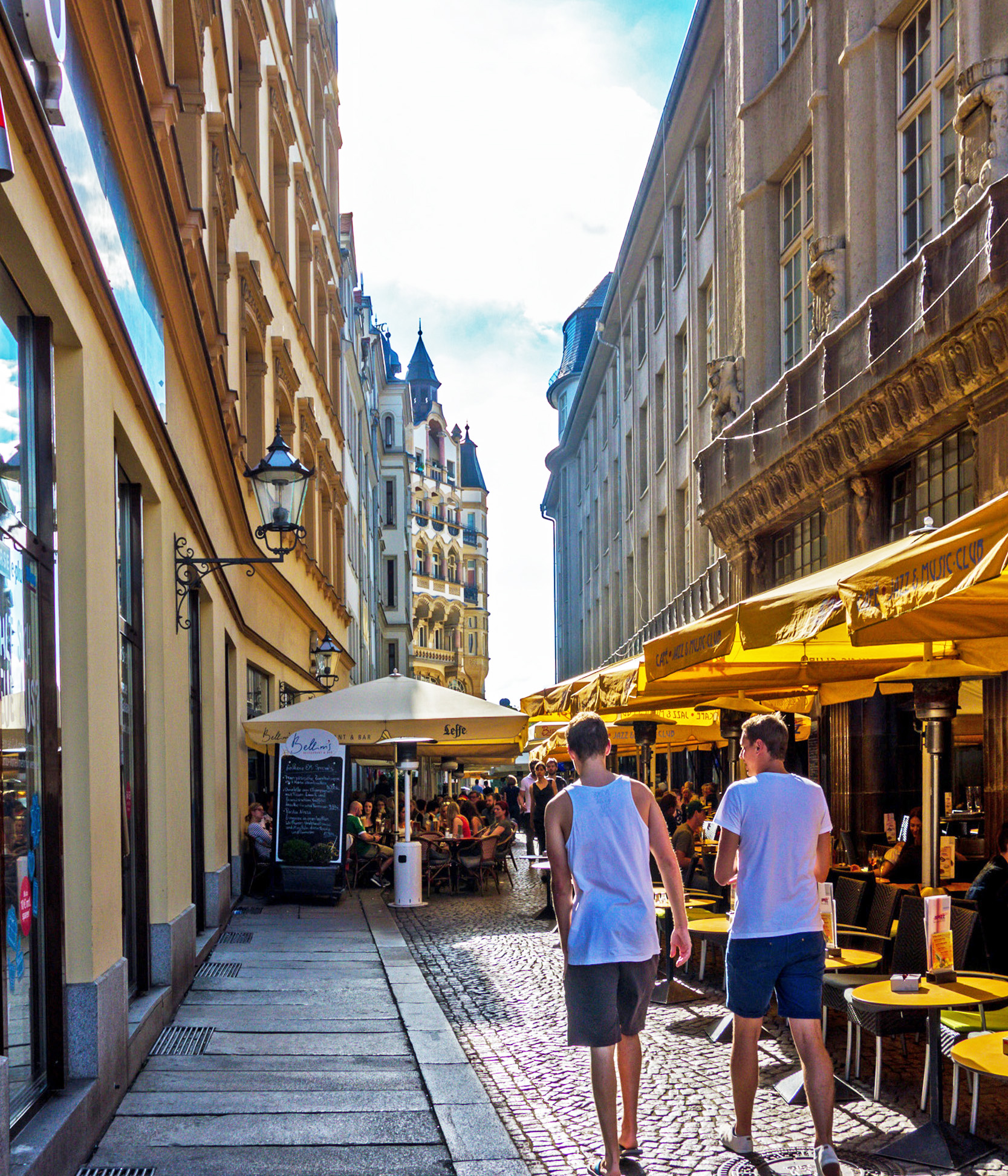
- View from the Markt in Barfußgäßchen (2016)
- Length: 160 m (520 ft)
- Width: 6–8 m (19.7–26.2 ft)
- Location: Leipzig-Mitte, Leipzig, Germany
- Postal code: 04109
- Nearest metro station: Leipzig Markt station of S-Bahn Mitteldeutschland
- West end: Dittrichring
- East end: Markt

Construction
- Completion: created in the middle ages

The Barfußgäßchen is a 160 m (524.9 ft) long residential street in the city center of Leipzig. It connects the market with the Dittrichring and is one of the city's party miles.

== History ==
In the first half of the 13th century, a monastery of the Franciscans, who were also called discalced or barefooters because they wore no shoes or at most sandals, was built in the northwest part of the city. So the name Barfußgasse (barfoot alley) became common for the route from the market to the monastery. It led from the market west to Klostergasse coming from the south and then northwest to the monastery, past a small passage through the city wall, the Barefoot Portal (Barfußpförtchen). As early as 1439, the rear part of Barfußgäßchen from Klostergasse to the monastery and further to the Ranstädt gate was called Fleischergasse, which was divided into Große and Kleine Fleischergasse in 1839. This ended the Barfußgäßchen at Klostergasse.

From 1902 onwards, houses on Klostergasse and Kleine Fleischergasse were demolished in order to create a continuation of Barfußgäßchen westwards to Thomasring as section of the Inner City Ring Road (from 1917 Dittrichring). The new section of the street was built with residential and commercial buildings in the historicist style until 1910.

By the bombing of Leipzig in World War II, the numbers 11 were slightly damaged and the number 15 was badly damaged in this part. Of the latter, only the ground floor remained. The complete reconstruction did not take place until 1996. Apart from a travel agency at No. 11 and a children's goods store at No. 13, after the well-known Senf brothers' stamp shop closed in 2008, the ground floor area of Barfußgäßchen is almost exclusively used for gastronomy.

== Development ==
The entrance from the market is flanked on the north side by the König-Albert-Haus, built in 1913, which is opposite the former Kaufhalle trade fair building from 1848 on the south side. Between the two buildings that form part of the market, the Barfußgäßchen has its narrowest point at around 6 m (19.7 ft); the following section is about 8 m (26.2 ft) wide.

On the south side, there are three houses adjoining the department store, which were built together with the department store's predecessor in the 16th century and still have cross vaults on the ground floor. These so-called Zinshäuser (revenue houses) are the oldest apartment buildings in the city. As a corner house on Klostergasse, the traditional Zills Tunnel inn follows its design from 1887. To the west of Klostergasse there is a complex of three four-story buildings built between 1904 and 1906, which is called the Trifugium.

On the north side, the König-Albert-Haus with four house numbers (2–8) extends far into Barfußgäßchen. After another building, Kleine Fleischergasse enters at an angle, creating a small triangular square on which the Lipsia Fountain, also known as the Puttos Fountain, has stood since 1913. The Lipsia House was built on the west side of the square in 1909/1910, where the Filmeck cinema operated until 1963.

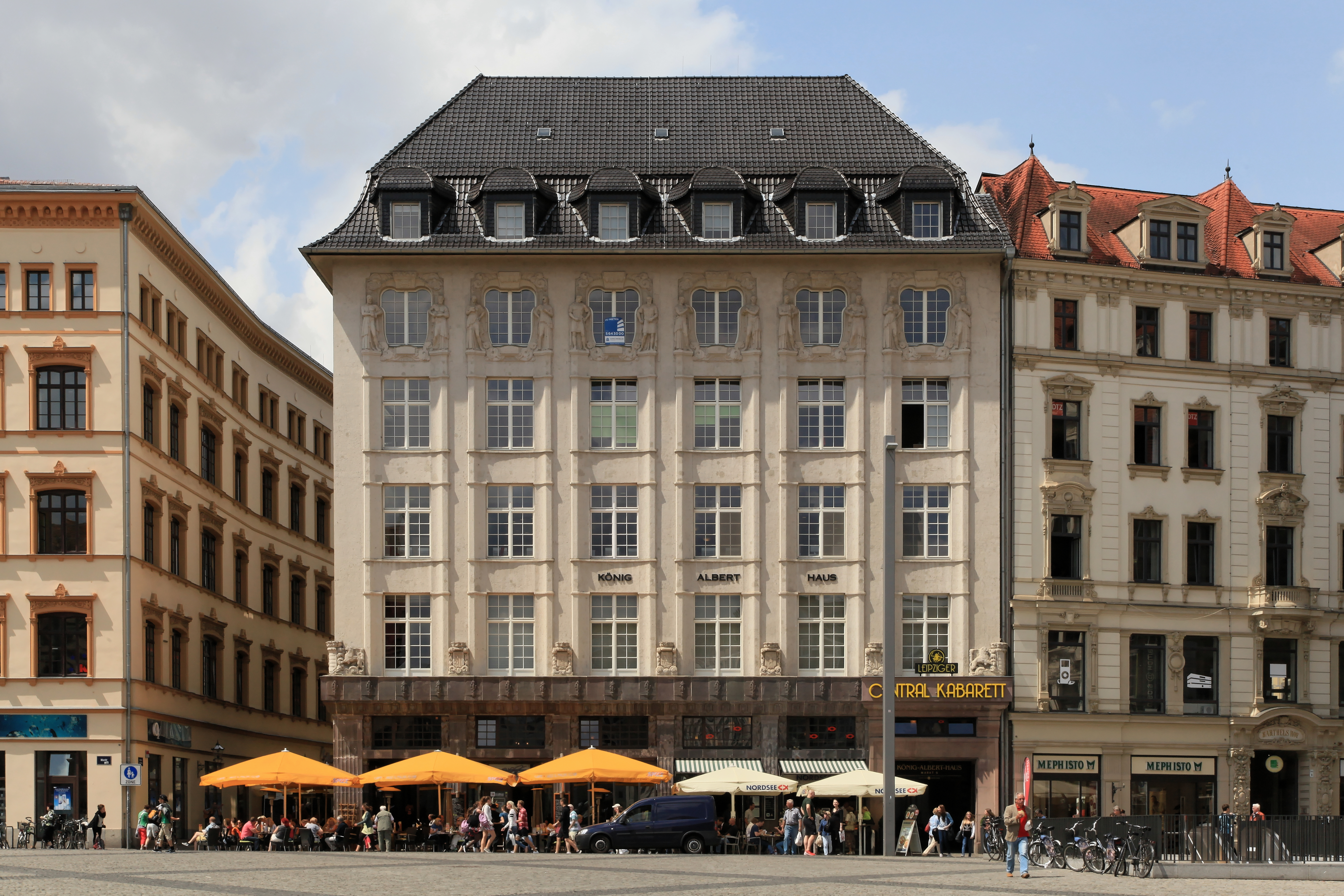
Begin of the Barfußgäßchen at the Markt (2015)

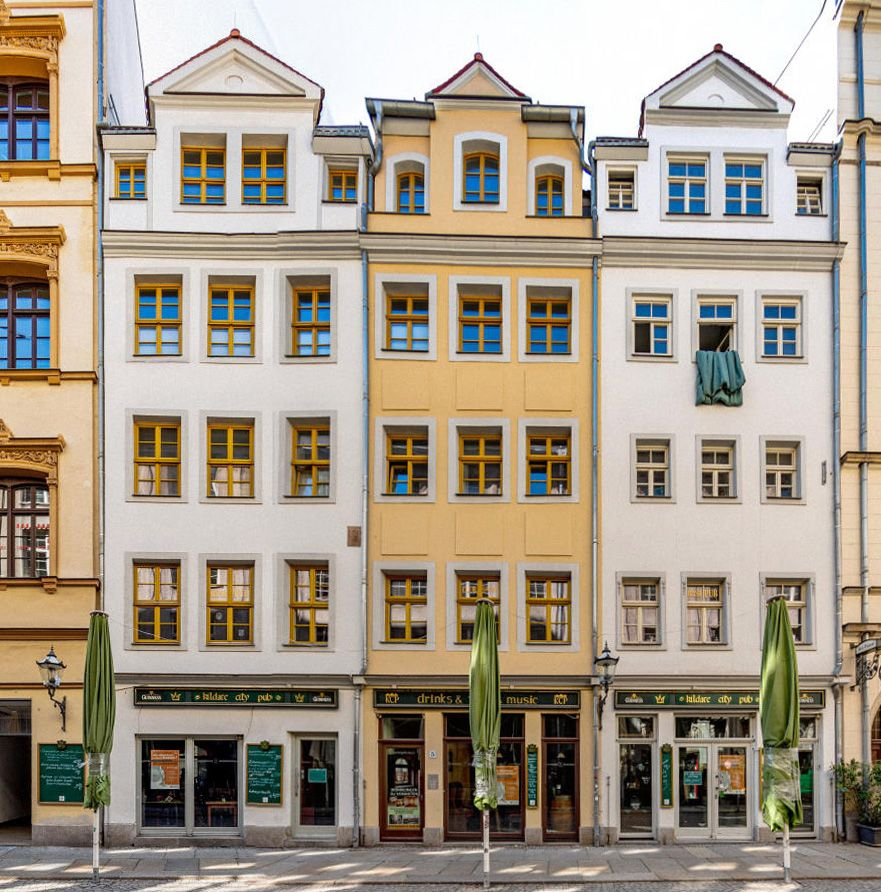
Apartment buildings from the 16th century (2020)

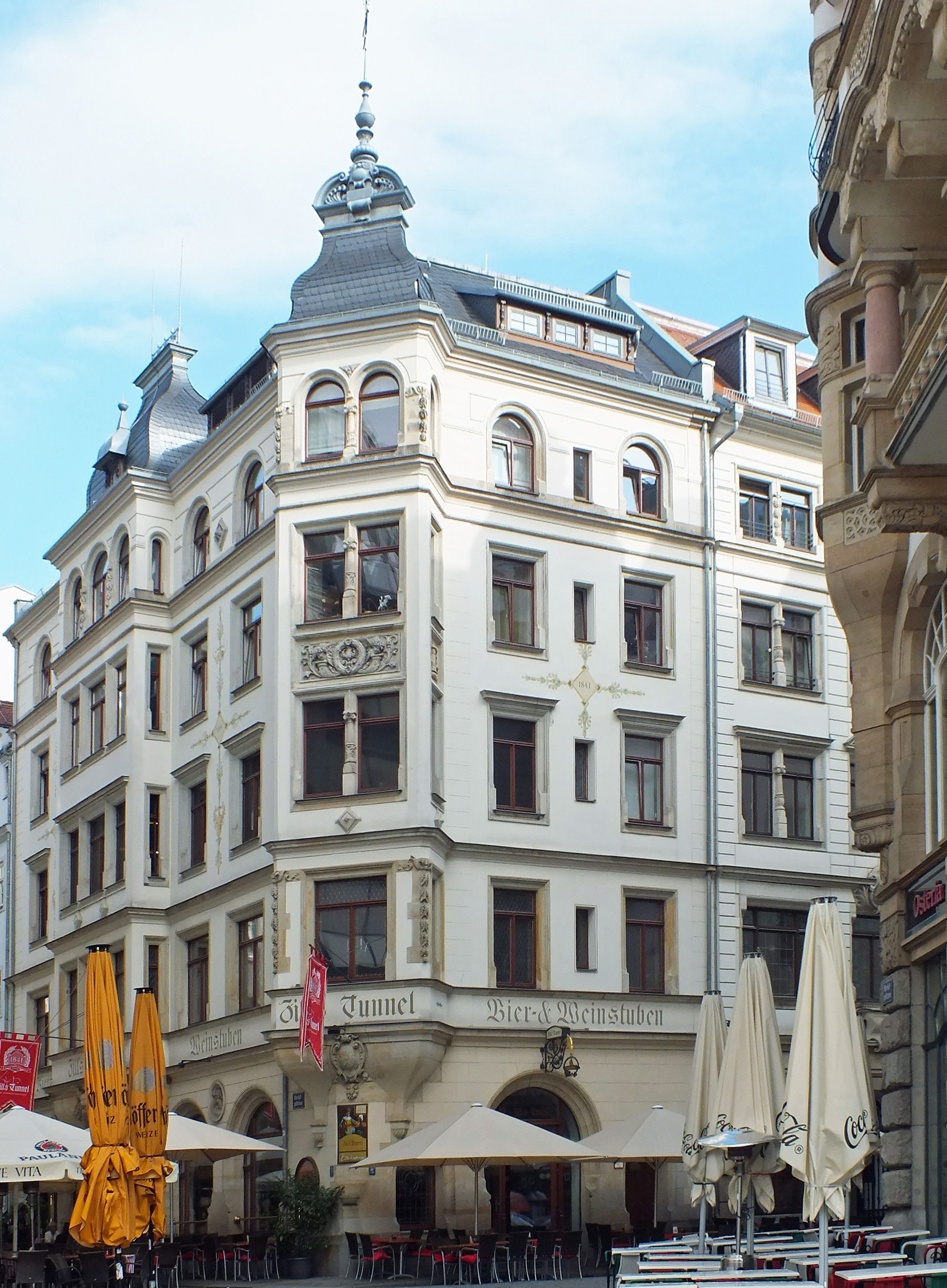
Zills Tunnel (2017)

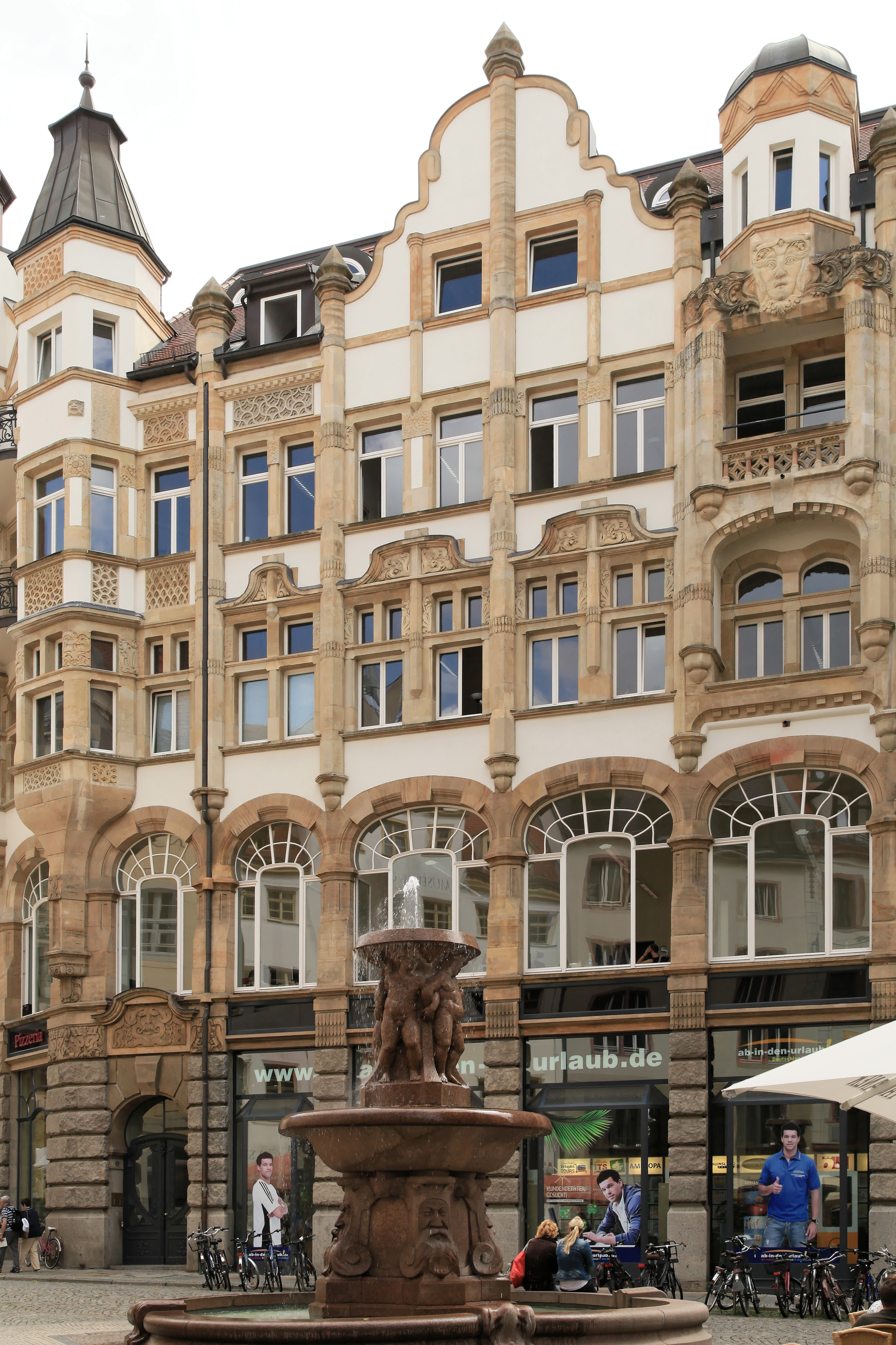
Part of the Trifugium, Barfußgäßchen No. 11 (2015)

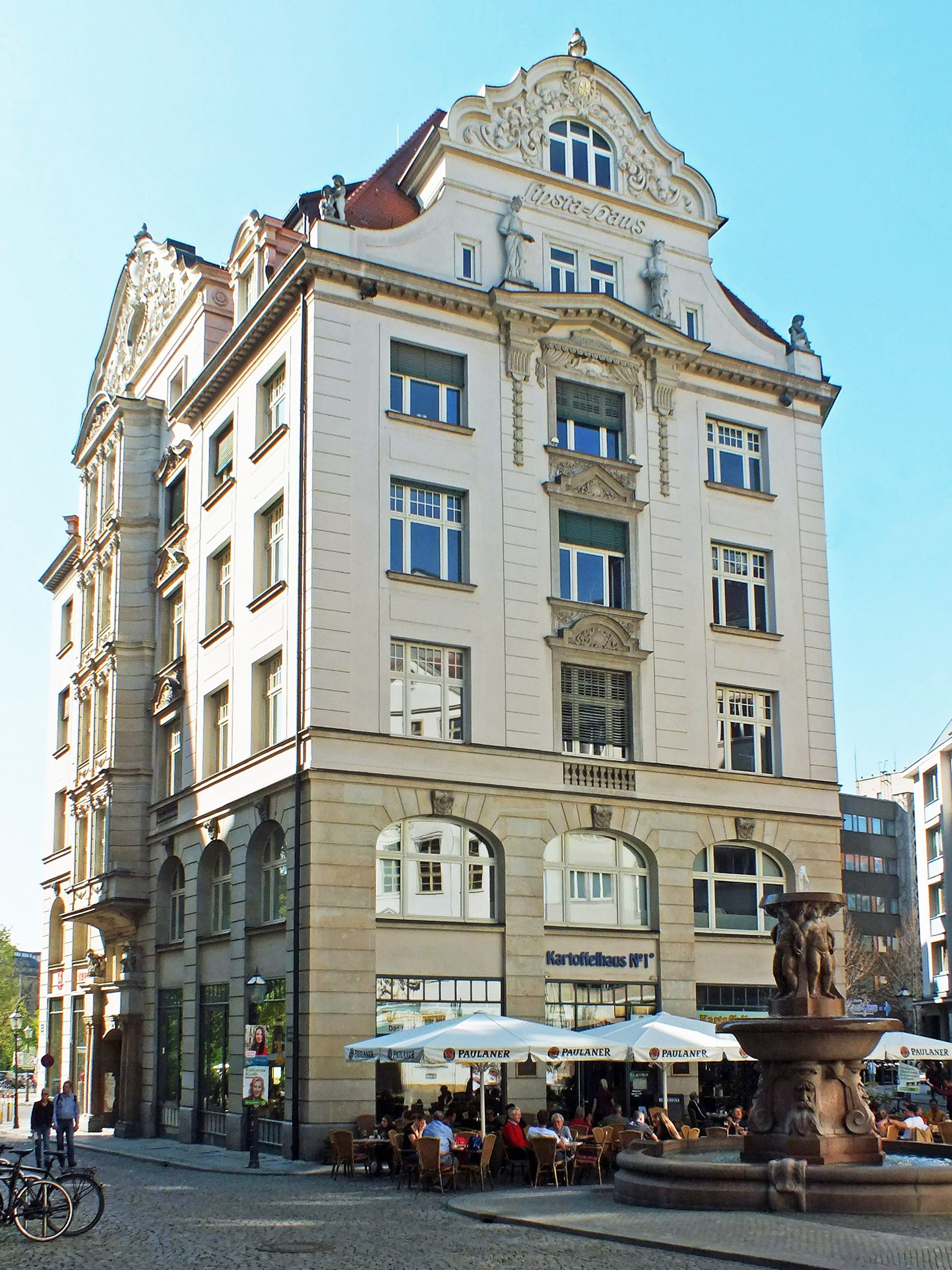
Lipsia House with Lipsia Fountain (2019)

== Gastronomy ==
There are eleven dining establishments from traditional bourgeois restaurants to hip, alternative pubs with the address Barfußgäßchen on the 160 m (524.9 ft) length of the street. All year round you can use the numerous outdoor seats here until late at night.

The Barfußgäßchen is the center of the Drallewatsch pub area, which covers almost the entire western city center.

== See also ==
- List of streets and squares in Leipzig

== Bibliography ==
- Klank, Gina; Griebsch, Gernoth (1995). Stadtarchiv Leipzig (ed.). Lexikon Leipziger Straßennamen [Leipzig street names] (in German). Leipzig: Verlag im Wissenschaftszentrum Leipzig. p. 32. ISBN 3-930433-09-5.
- Schwarz, Peter (2014). Das tausendjährige Leipzig. Vom Ende des 18. bis zum Beginn des 20. Jahrhunderts (in German). Leipzig: Pro Leipzig. pp. 498–499. ISBN 978-3-945027-05-9.
