= Leipzig City Gates =

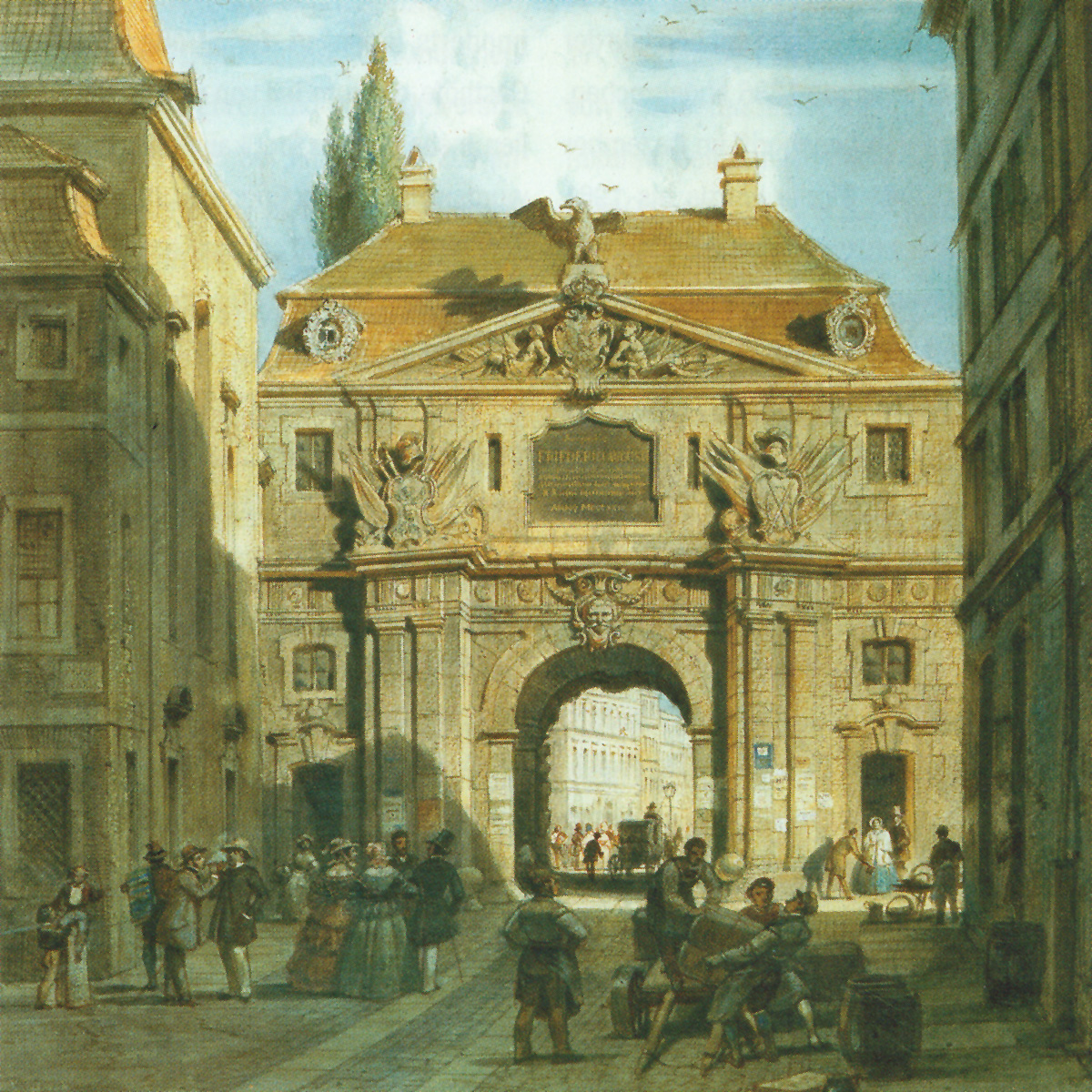
Peter's gate (Peterstor) by Matthäus Daniel Pöppelmann in 1859 – shortly before its demolition

The Leipzig city gates were structural facilities that existed from the Middle Ages to the 19th century to regulate and control the movement of people and goods into and out of the city of Leipzig, Germany. They initially also had a defensive function. In addition to the four main gates and the five known smaller gates (wickets) through the city wall, several so-called outer gates were later added, which controlled the access roads to the city as secondary gates. None of the gates remain at their original locations.

== History ==
Since the Middle Ages, the city was surrounded by two walls of different heights, with the higher one on the inside. Between the walls was the Zwinger, which could be walked around the city, and in front of the outer wall was the water-filled city moat. There were gates with drawbridges at four points. At the gates, the city wall was provided with horseshoe-shaped extensions for better defense. There were also a few small wickets.

After the siege of Leipzig in the Schmalkaldic War, the city fortifications were expanded in the mid-16th century, particularly with the addition of bastions - known here as Bastei. A remnant of such a structure, preserved mainly underground, still exists today in the form of the Moritzbastei in the southeast corner of the old town on the inner city ring, which largely marks the outer course of the former city wall. Strengthening the city fortifications also required the redesign of the gates. Some of these were rebuilt and now also included tower structures. After the Thirty Years' War, further additions to the city fortifications were made and the gates were renewed. After Elector Frederick Augustus II had ordered the demolition of the city fortifications in 1763 due to the experience of the Seven Years' War and the loss of their military-strategic importance, their removal began in the 1770s. The city gates were initially retained, however. As the city expanded, they were supplemented by outer city gates on the most important access roads into the city. These side gates eventually lost their importance in the Gründerzeit years. The historic main gates became an obstacle to traffic at the beginning of the 19th century and were demolished between 1822 and 1831, except for the Peter's gate (Peterstor) in today's Petersstrasse, which was demolished in 1860. Some of the side gates remained for a while, as long as they did not represent an obstacle to traffic and did not stand in the way of the redevelopment of the Vorstadts from the middle of the 19th century. For example, the back gate (Hintertor) on Schützenstrasse was demolished in 1843 and the Zeitz gate (Zeitzer Tor) on today's Karl-Liebknecht-Straße was not demolished until 1856.

== Gate regulations ==
The gate regulations had developed over the course of centuries and are a reflection of the importance of the four main gates on the Via Regia and the Via Imperii for Leipzig as a trading and trade fair city.

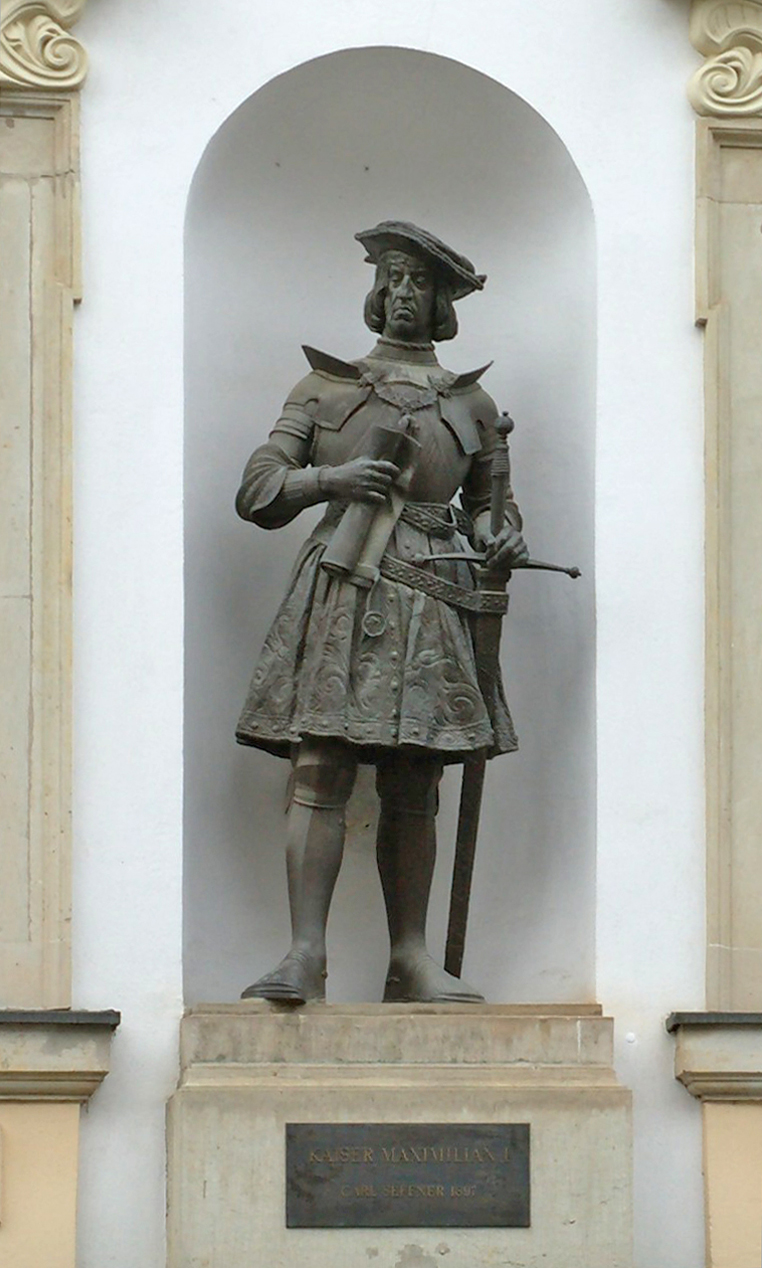
Bronze statue of Maximilian I, Holy Roman Emperor, by Carl Seffner at the Städtisches Kaufhaus trade court building (2012)

Initially in the Middle Ages, different laws applied when passing through the gates in one direction or the other. Town privileges essentially ended for people, traffic, crafts and trade at the city gates. Outside the city gates and on the streets and paths, the Landrecht of the territorial lord applied. Due to its favorable location at the intersection of two historic roads and trails in Central Europe, Leipzig was granted special privileges. The city benefited enormously from these privileges and from the road requirement that existed almost until modern times. The city's staple right and the imperial trade fair privilege granted by Maximilian I, Holy Roman Emperor, in 1497, renewed and expanded in 1507, were particularly crucial for the handling of goods. This kept competition from other cities - especially Erfurt and Halle (Saale) - at bay within a radius of 15 German miles (approx. 115 km (71.5 mi)). Trade and passenger traffic were thus directed towards Leipzig.

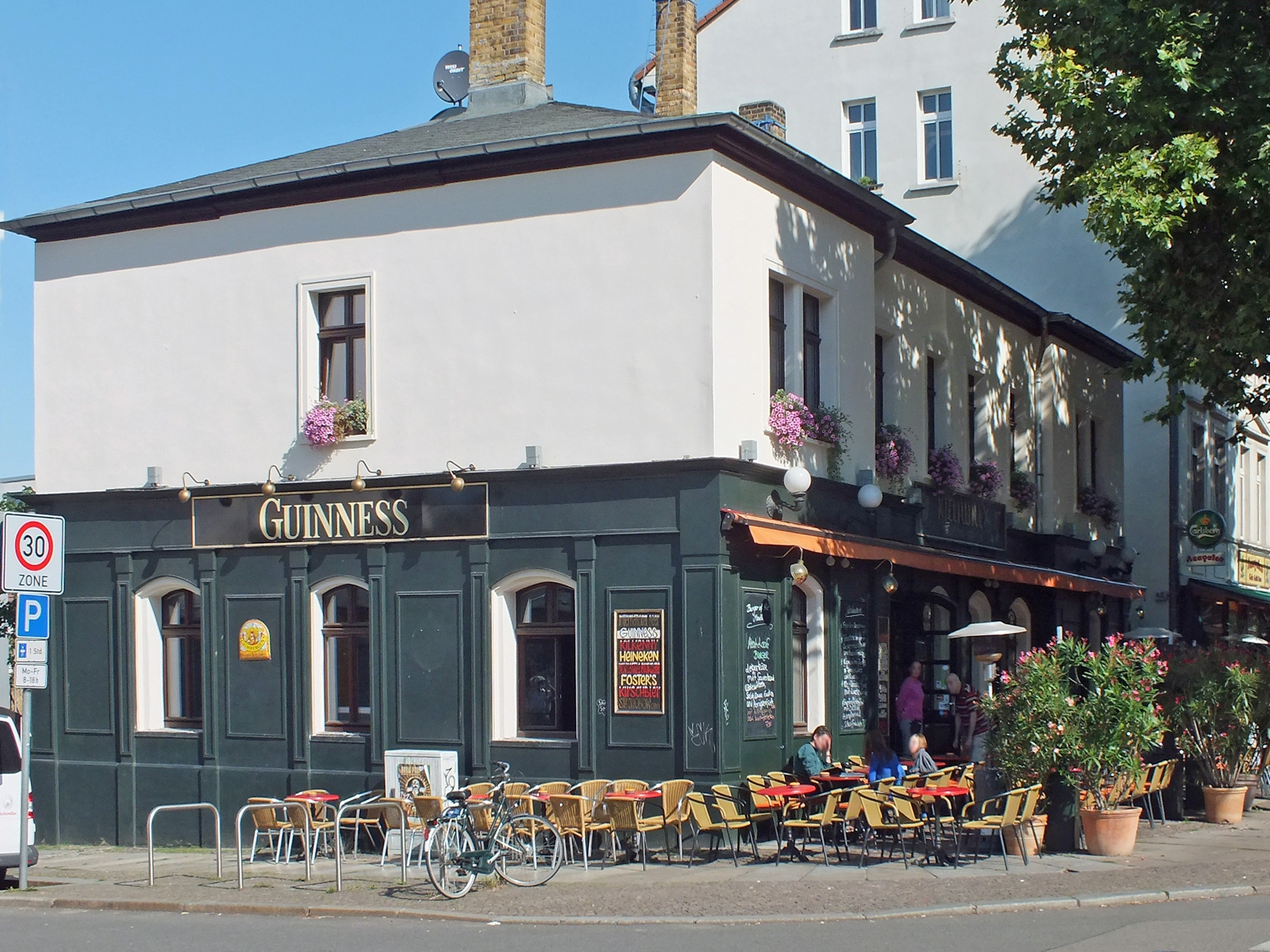
The former gatekeeper's house at the Zeitz gate (Zeitzer Tor) in its current state, Karl-Liebknecht-Strasse No. 44 (2013)

At the city gates, which were the starting and ending points of the trade routes and land routes, the transport of goods into and out of the city was controlled and only what was actually registered here was what was responsible for municipal gate clerks and measuring assistants. They issued slips of paper showing what a wagon, cart or pack animal was carrying. The tariffs were only collected at the Markt after the goods had been weighed in the Alte Waage and the duty or octroi had been calculated. In addition, there was a so-called "booth fee" that the market traders had to pay for selling goods at the market. When leaving the city, the gatekeepers checked whether a trader had paid all customs duties and taxes correctly based on the receipts issued by the market supervisors or the city treasury. Such gate receipts are now important historical sources for reconstructing the flow of goods and people into and out of the city over the centuries.

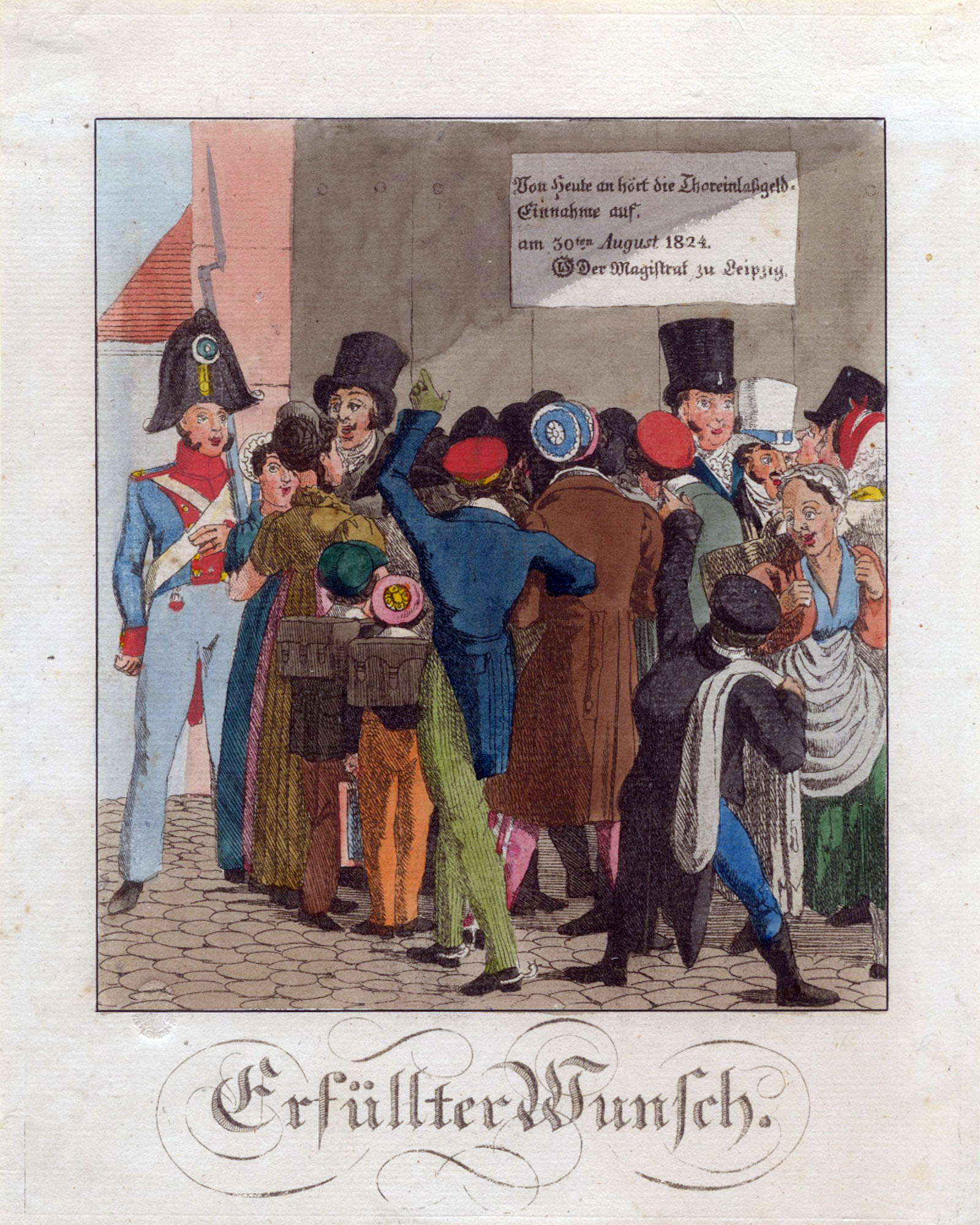
Pen drawing from 1824 on the abolition of the gate penny – on the left a gatekeeper in uniform, in the middle of the picture students with typical student caps

People were also checked at the gates. The names of arriving travellers were published daily in a list, the Torzettel (gate slips), as they were processed at the gates. A fee called the Torgroschen (gate penny) was also payable at all city gates, which was a type of entrance fee into the city. This was an old institution similar to the bridge toll. The income was originally intended to finance the maintenance of the gates and the city fortifications. The gate clerks, gatekeepers and the so-called Schlagzieher at the outer gates were also paid from this money for operating the barriers or opening the gates. This fee is comparable to road tolls, which were collected to pay for the maintenance of the old roads that were later converted into chaussees.

The freedom of movement of people and goods was not unlimited until 1824 and ultimately encountered considerable obstacles at the four inner city gates. Although the city wall was almost completely removed at the end of the 18th century, the city moat in front of it still existed in many places. Bridges led over this to the main gates, which thus controlled access to the old town even in this situation. For security reasons, the city gates were closed at night. This happened after 9 p.m. in summer and at 4.30 p.m. in winter. From the 17th century onwards, anyone who wanted to enter or leave the city during closing times had to pay the so-called gate fee. This generally hated tax was abolished throughout the Kingdom of Saxony in 1824 when internal customs duties were abolished. This occasion led to spontaneous celebrations of joy among the population, especially among Leipzig students. As night owls in the bars of the vorstadts and villages in the surrounding area (especially Eutritzsch, Gohlis, Reudnitz) they had always rejected the gate tax. The abolition of the gate tax, the demolition of the city gates and, last but not least, the gradual filling of the city moat marked the beginning of the merging of Leipzig's old town with its suburbs.

== The gates ==
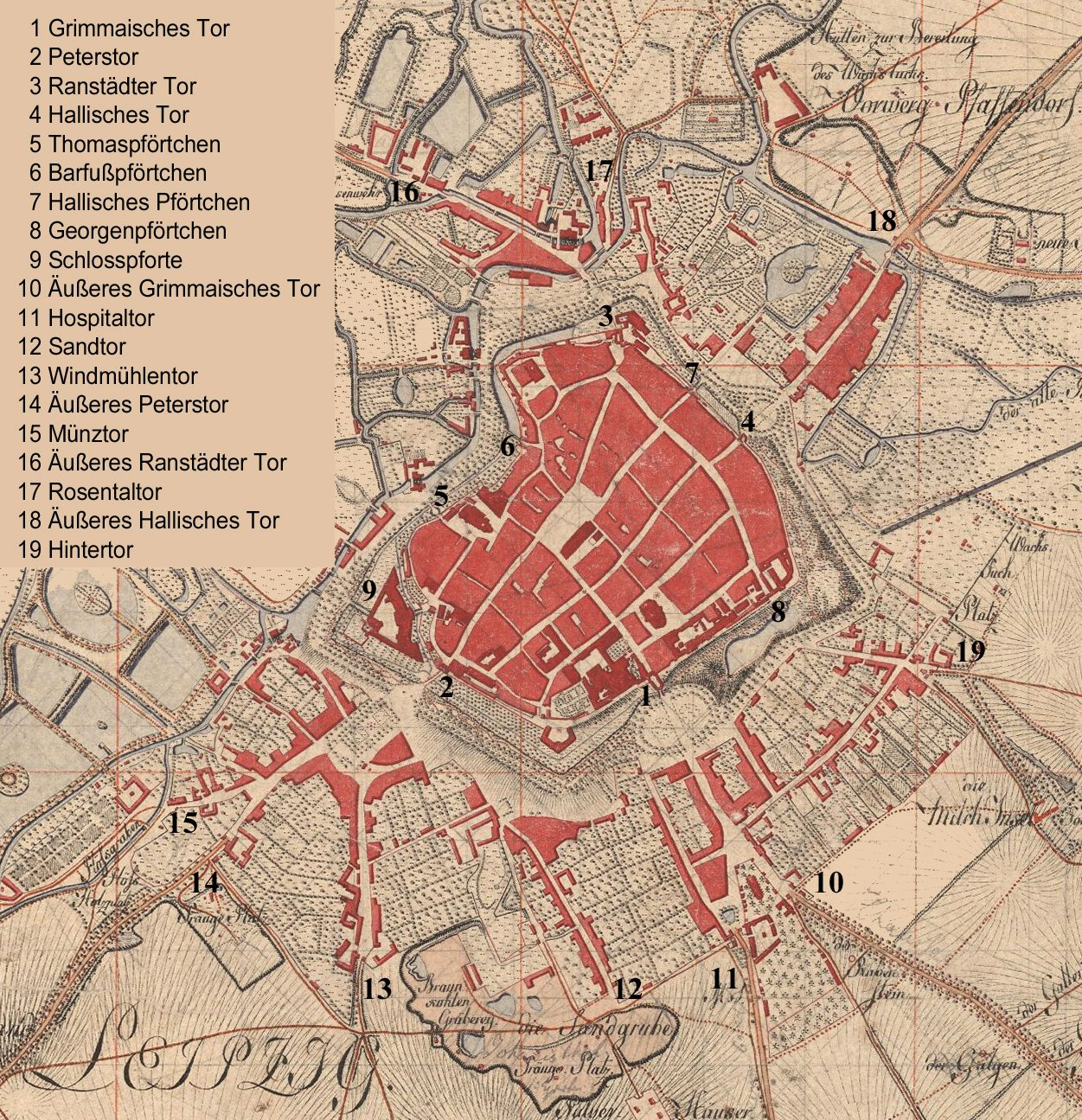
The location of the Leipzig city gates on a map from 1800

=== Inner Gates ===
The inner gates are those that were located along the city wall and formed the historical entrances to the old city. Since the old trade routes Via Regia and Via Imperii crossed in Leipzig, four main gates were assigned to them, which also roughly corresponded to the cardinal points. From these gates began cobbled streets, so-called stone ways (Steinweg), which were named after the gate and which, with the exception of the Halle one, are still used as street names today. The four neighbourhoods of the city center and the vorstadts in front of the gates were also named after the gates. These vorstadts were old urban settlements outside the old town that spread out directly in front of the city wall.

- The Grimma Gate (Grimmaisches Tor - no. 1 on the plan), which faces east and serves as a sally point on the Via Regia, was built between 1498 and 1502 as a double gate system in the town wall with a drawbridge over the moat. Beyond the moat began the Grimma Stone Way (Grimmaischer Steinweg), which led out of town through the Grimma vorstadt to the outer Grimma Gate (Äußeres Grimmaisches Tor) and the Hospital Gate (Hospitaltor). In 1577 the town fortifications at the Grimma Gate were replaced by a stronger defensive system that extended far into the vorstadt and also included a tower that served as a debtors' prison tower for late payers in times of peace. In 1687 the town's main guard was moved here from the Ranstädt Gate. At the same time the medieval gate building was replaced by a new one decorated with the Saxon electoral coat of arms, and the square in front of it was created as a promenade. This almost rural-looking "square in front of the Grimma Gate" developed into today's Augustusplatz . After the Grimma Gate was demolished in 1831, the confectioner Wilhelm Felsche (1798–1867) bought the debtors' prison tower and the property adjacent to the former gate and built the Café français there in 1835, later known as the Café Felsche. In 1838, the New Post Office building was built by Albert Geutebrück (1801–1868) on the square at the corner of Grimmaischer Steinweg.
- The Via Imperii led south through the Peter's Gate (Peterstor - no. 2), which was named after the neighbouring St. Peter's Church. It was first mentioned in 1420. The medieval gate, which led through a tower, was replaced in 1722/23 by a new baroque building. It was designed by the chief state architect Matthäus Daniel Pöppelmann (1662–1736). A stone arched bridge led over the already dry city moat in front of the gate into the Petersvorstadt. The gate contained guard rooms and apartments for city officials. It was considered one of the most beautiful baroque buildings in Leipzig, but was the last of the historic city gates to be demolished in 1859/60 as a traffic obstruction.
- The Ranstädt Gate (Ranstädter Tor - no. 3) was located in the area of today's Richard-Wagner-Platz and was the western exit of the Via Regia. The gate was a double gate system integrated into the Ranstädt Bastion (Ranstädter Bastion or Rannische Bastion), which was built between 1547 and 1550. Until 1687, the city's main guard was located at the Ranstädt Gate - after that at the Grimma Gate. The name comes from the places that could be reached, Markranstädt and Altranstädt. The medieval gate system with a tower was demolished in 1822.
- The Halle Gate (Hallisches Tor - no. 4) leading north for the Via Imperii was built in 1692 and had only minor defensive significance. The gate was demolished in 1831. The street name "Am Hallischen Tor" between Brühl and the beginning of Gerberstrasse remained as a reminder.
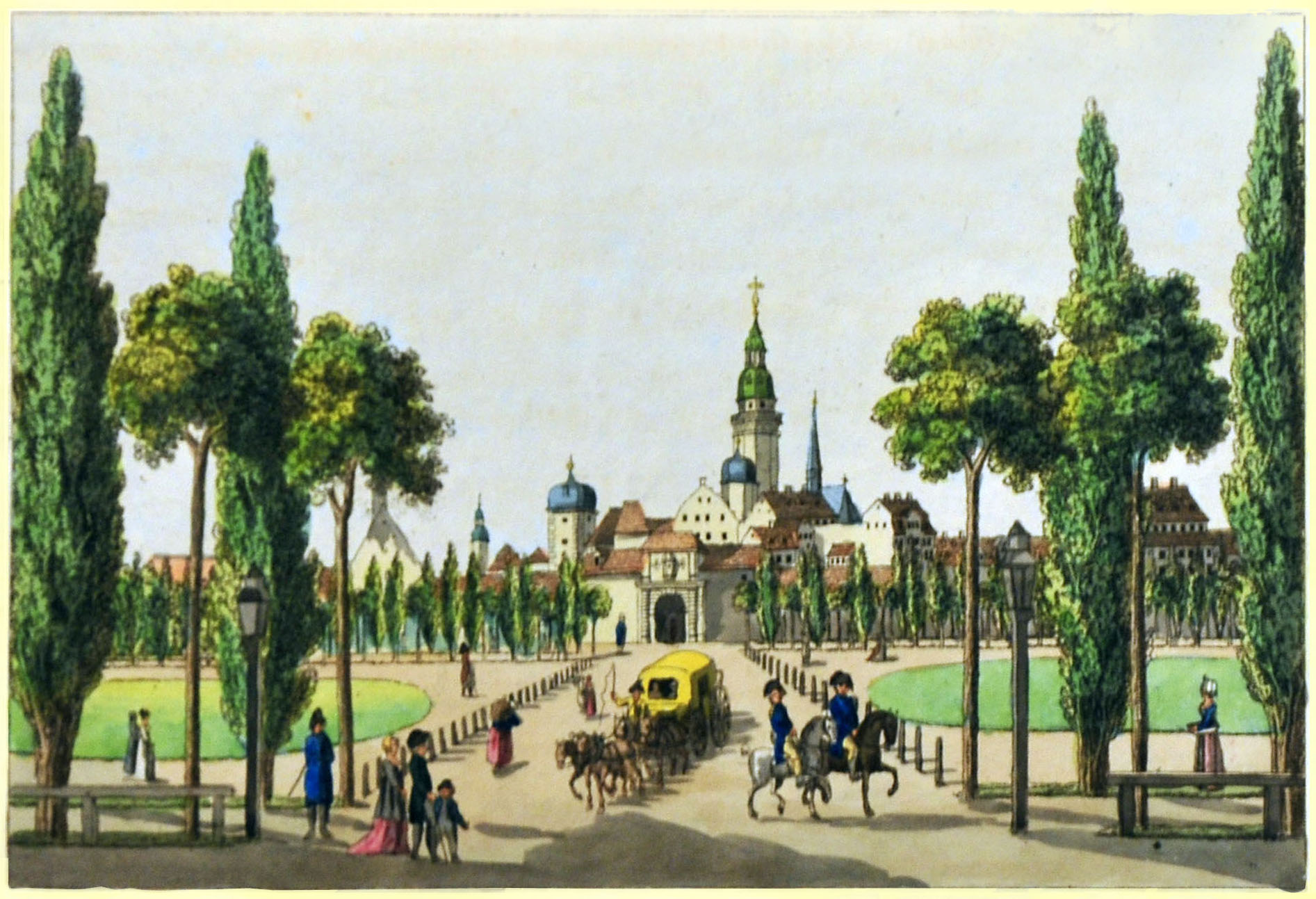
The Grimma Gate in 1804 with the "square in front of the Grimma Gate"

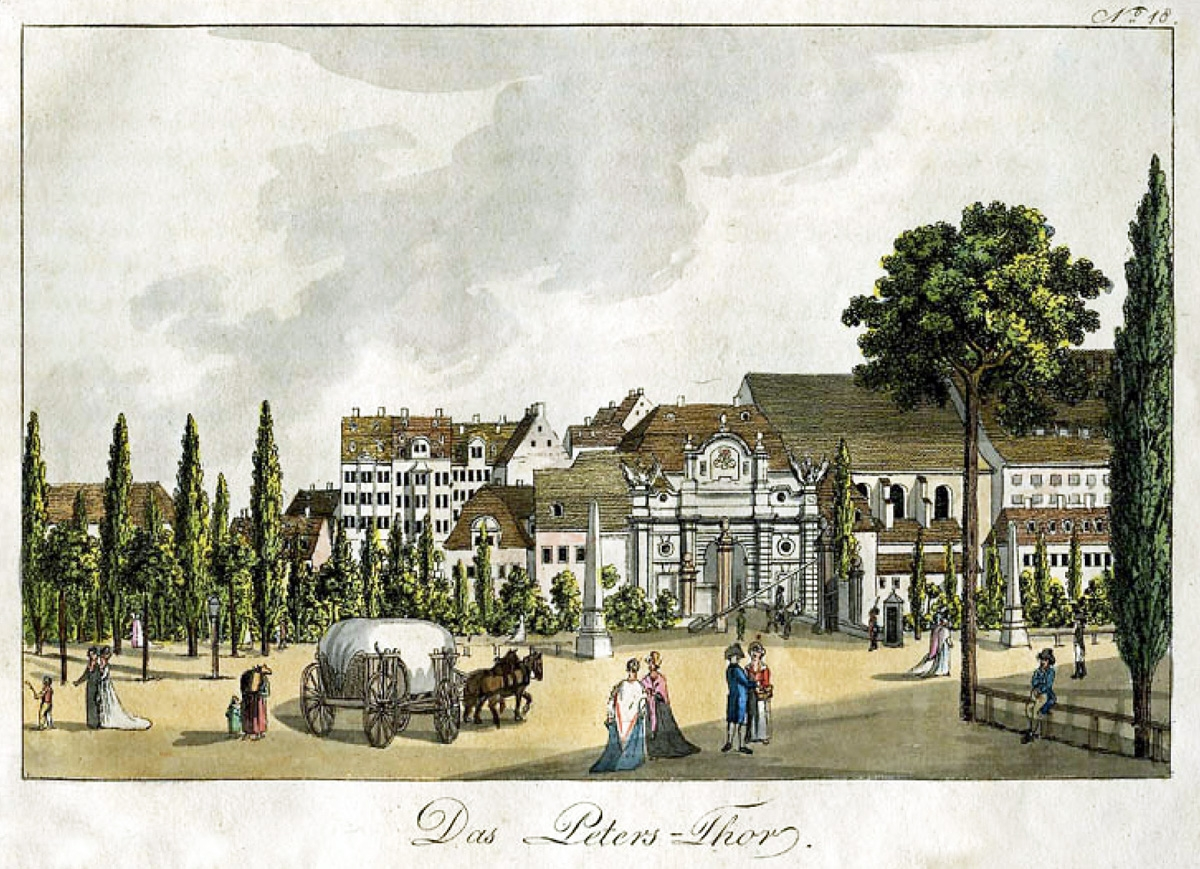
Peter's Gate 1804

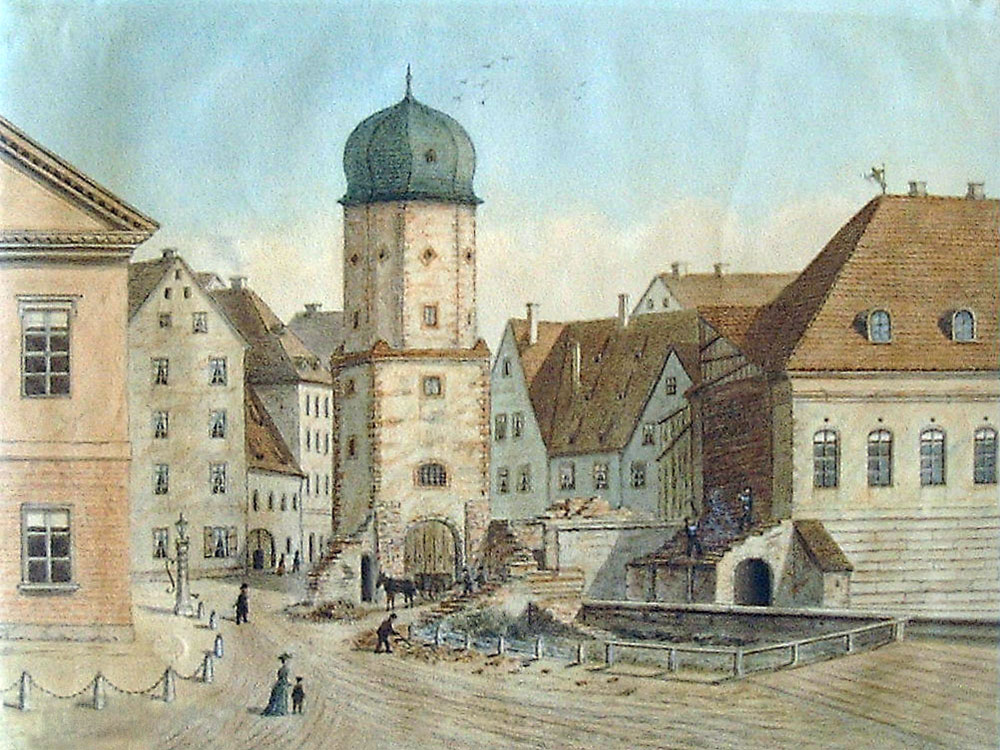
The Ranstädt Gate during demolition work in 1822

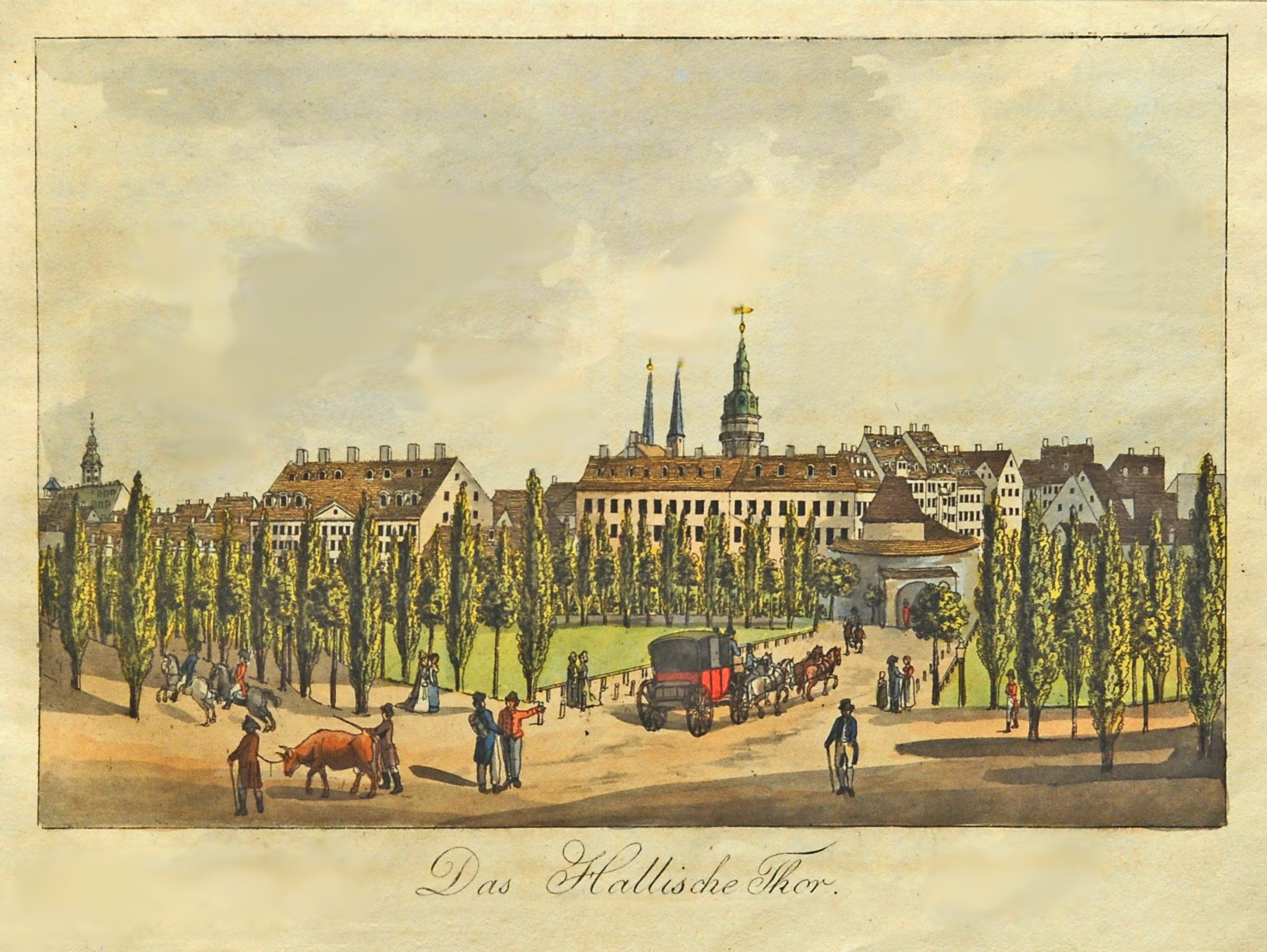
The Halle Gate (Hallisches Tor) 1804

=== Wickets ===
In addition to the gates, the city wall had several openings for pedestrian traffic. Because of the large distances between the city gates, they were mainly used to reach the western promenades facing the river Pleiße.

- The Thomas Portal (Thomaspförtchen - No. 5) was adjacent of the St. Thomas Church and led from the Thomas Churchyard next to the Old Thomas School to the Thomas Mill opposite.
- The Barefoot Portal (Barfußpförtchen - No. 6) was a narrow passageway leading from the Barfußgäßchen to a footbridge over the city moat. (This former part of the Barfußgäßchen is now called Kleine Fleischergasse.) The name of the gate goes back to the Franciscan monastery (they had the custom of going barefoot) located in this part of the city.
- The Halle Portal (Hallisches Pförtchen - No. 7) was at the end of an alley that was later called Plauensche Strasse. In 2012, the area was built over by the Höfe am Brühl complex. The old street line of Plauensche Straße now forms a passage between the courtyards on Brühl and Richard-Wagner-Strasse.
- The Georgen Portal (Georgenpförtchen - No. 8) at the eastern end of the Brühl at the Georgenhaus provided easy access to the eastern park with the Schneckenberg, the Swan Pond (Schwanensee) and the "Gothic Gate" (Gotisches Tor - park decoration in neogothic style) in the so-called "English Garden".
- The Castle Portal (Schlosspforte - No. 9) was a direct access from outside the city to the Pleissenburg (today: New Town Hall). This had become possible when the Pleissenburg gradually lost its military importance after the Thirty Years' War.
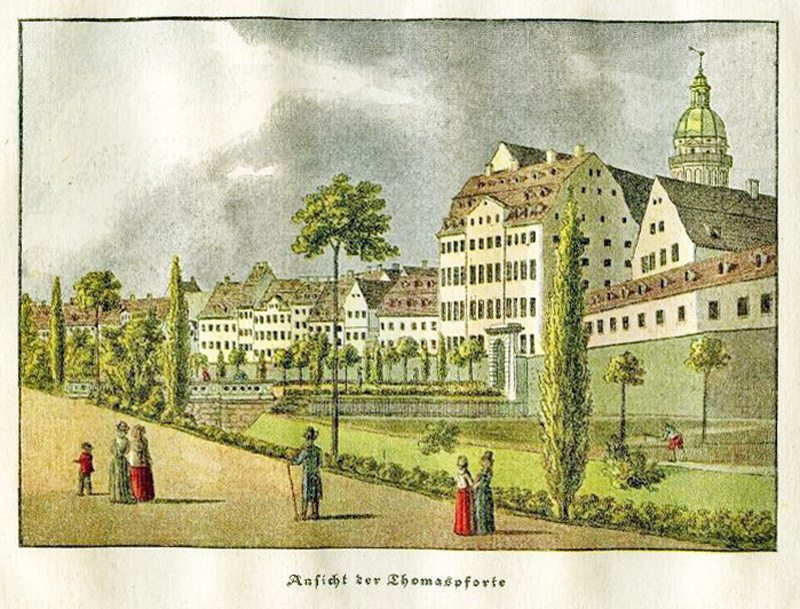
The Thomas Portal around 1800

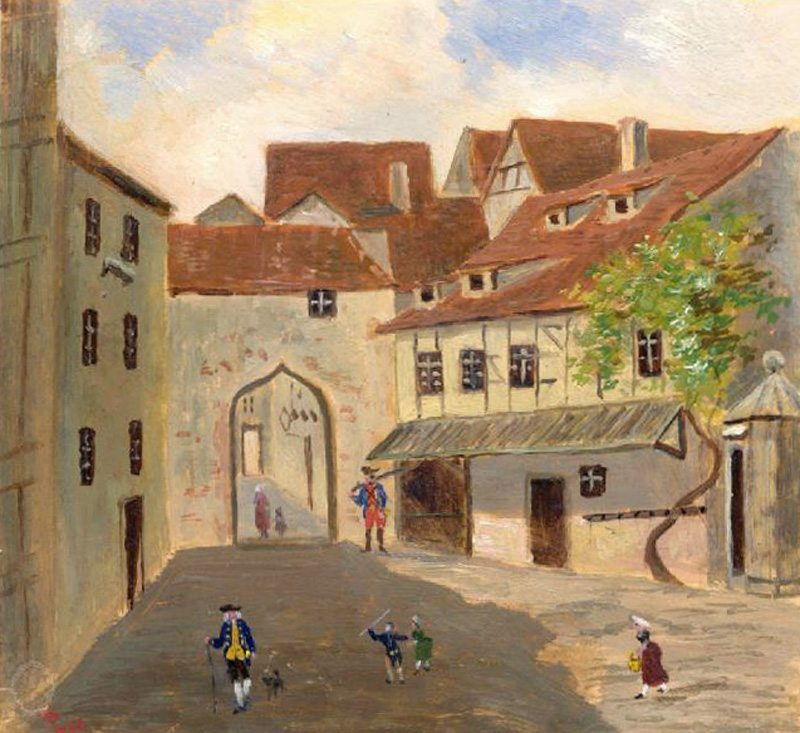
The Barefoot Portal around 1750

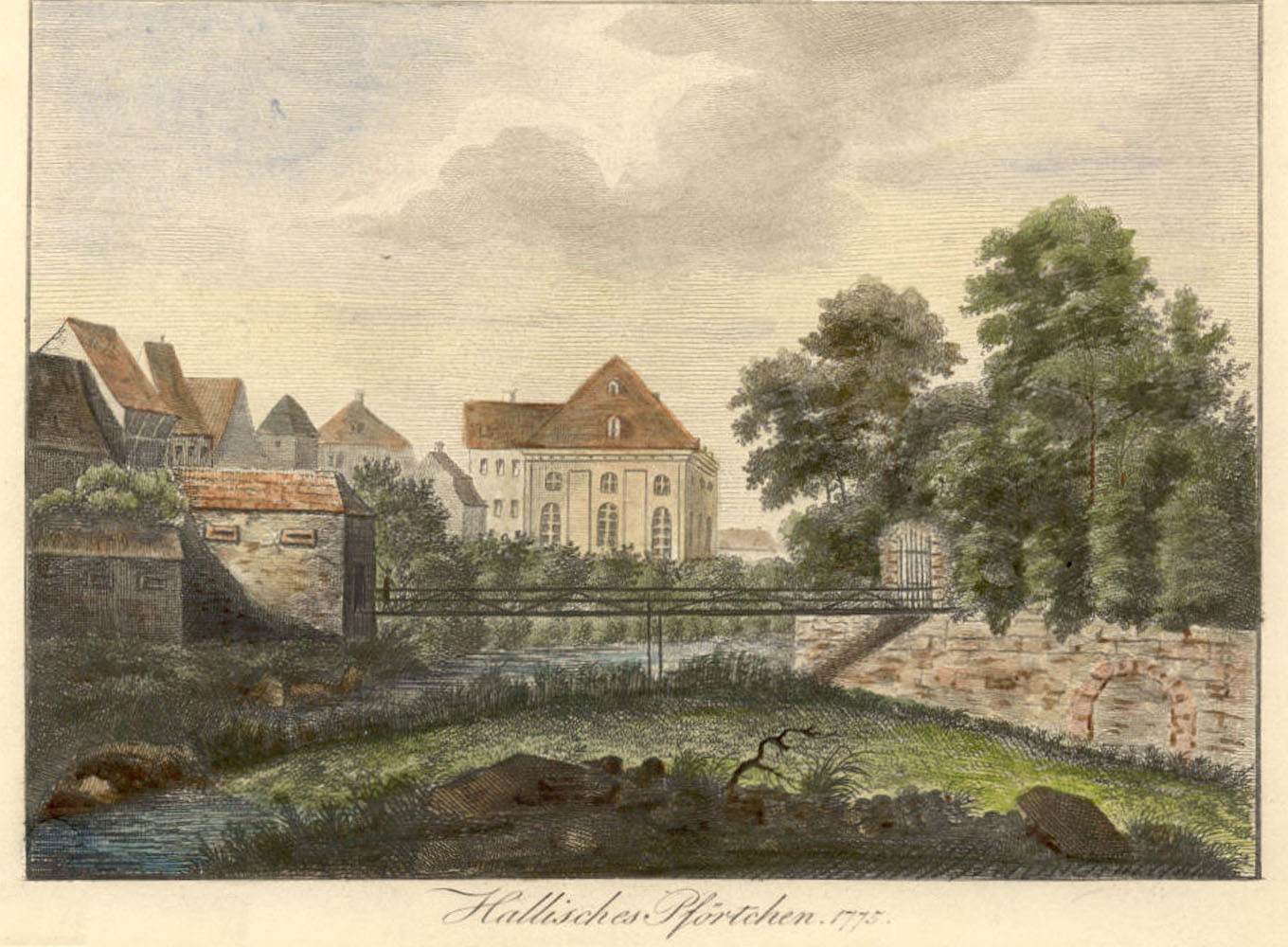
The Halle Portal 1795,
in the background the Altes Theater

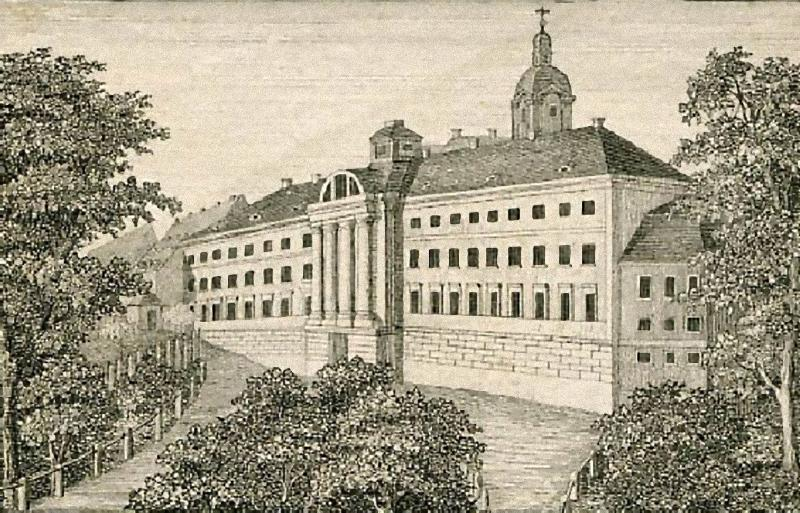
The Georgenhaus with the Georgen Portal (left)

=== Outer Gates ===
The outer city gates first became necessary when the city expanded beyond its walls, and lost their purpose in the second half of the 19th century when these too were overwhelmed by the city's growth. They were not as elaborately designed as the inner city gates and mostly consisted only of guardhouses and gates with simple wings or barriers.

- The Outer Grimma Gate (Äußeres Grimmaisches Tor, also Kohlgärtner Gate; no. 10) was located on the north side of the Alter Johannisfriedhof (Old St. John's Cemetery), approximately at the junction of today's Salomonstrasse and Dresdner Strasse, and controlled the road to Dresden via Wurzen and Eilenburg.

- The Hospital Gate (Hospitaltor - no. 11) was located on the road to Grimma next to the Old Johannishospital, where the Talstrasse now meets the Prager Strasse. The street name Vor dem Hospitaltore (that means "in front of the hospital gate") near the Ostplatz still reminds us of the Hospital Gate.

- The Sand Gate (Sandtor - no. 12) was of little importance. It led from the former Johannisvorstadt into the Johannistal, where there were sand pits - hence the name. The Sand Gate was at the end of Ulrichsgasse (today Seeburgstrasse). Later, a new Sand Gate was built at the end of Holzgasse (today Sternwartenstrasse) .

- The Windmill Gate (Windmühlentor - no. 13) stood at the end of Windmühlengasse, now extended as Windmühlenstrasse, roughly between the current junctions of Härtelstrasse and Emilienstrasse. When the gate was dismantled, the owner of the Wachau manor took it to the local park, where it has been preserved to this day. This makes it the only structural remnant of the former Leipzig city gates.
- The Outer Peter's Gate (Äußeres Peterstor, sometimes also Zeitz Gate - no. 14) was located at the end of the Peterssteinweg at about the height of today's Riemannstrasse on the long-distance connection to Nuremberg.

- The Mint Gate (Münztor, also Float Gate; no. 15) was located at about the same height, but in the Münzgasse branching off from Peterssteinweg. Since the Mint Gate did not lead to any long-distance connections, but only to the Floßplatz, it was primarily used to control the import of wood into the city.
- The Outer Ranstädt Gate (Äußeres Ranstädter Tor, also Äußeres Rannisches Tor, Frankfurter Tor or Wasser Tor - no. 16) was located directly behind the Ranstädt stone way (Ranstädter Steinweg) bridge over the river White Elster, and was therefore located between the Kleine and Große Funkenburg. This corresponds today roughly to the junction of Thomasiusstrasse and Jahnallee. Jahnallee used to be called Frankfurter Strasse and, as a continuation of Ranstädter Steinweg, led via Lindenau to Frankfurt.
- The Rosental Gate (Rosentaltor - no. 17) at the end of Rosentalgasse led to the old Jacobshospital and through the Rosental to Gohlis.

- The Outer Halle Gate (Äußeres Hallisches Tor, also Gerbertor - no. 18) was located at the end of the Halle stone way, later Gerbergasse, today Gerberstrasse, behind the bridge over the Parthe. It was intended for traffic to Halle, Delitzsch, Düben, Wittenberg and Dessau, among others.

- The Back Gate (Hintertor, also Schönefelder or Tauchaer Tor - no. 19) was on the way to Schönefeld, to Taucha and to a popular garden restaurant named Milchinsel. The gate stood at the end of the Hintergasse, today's Schützenstrasse, approximately in front of the current junction of Chopinstrasse.
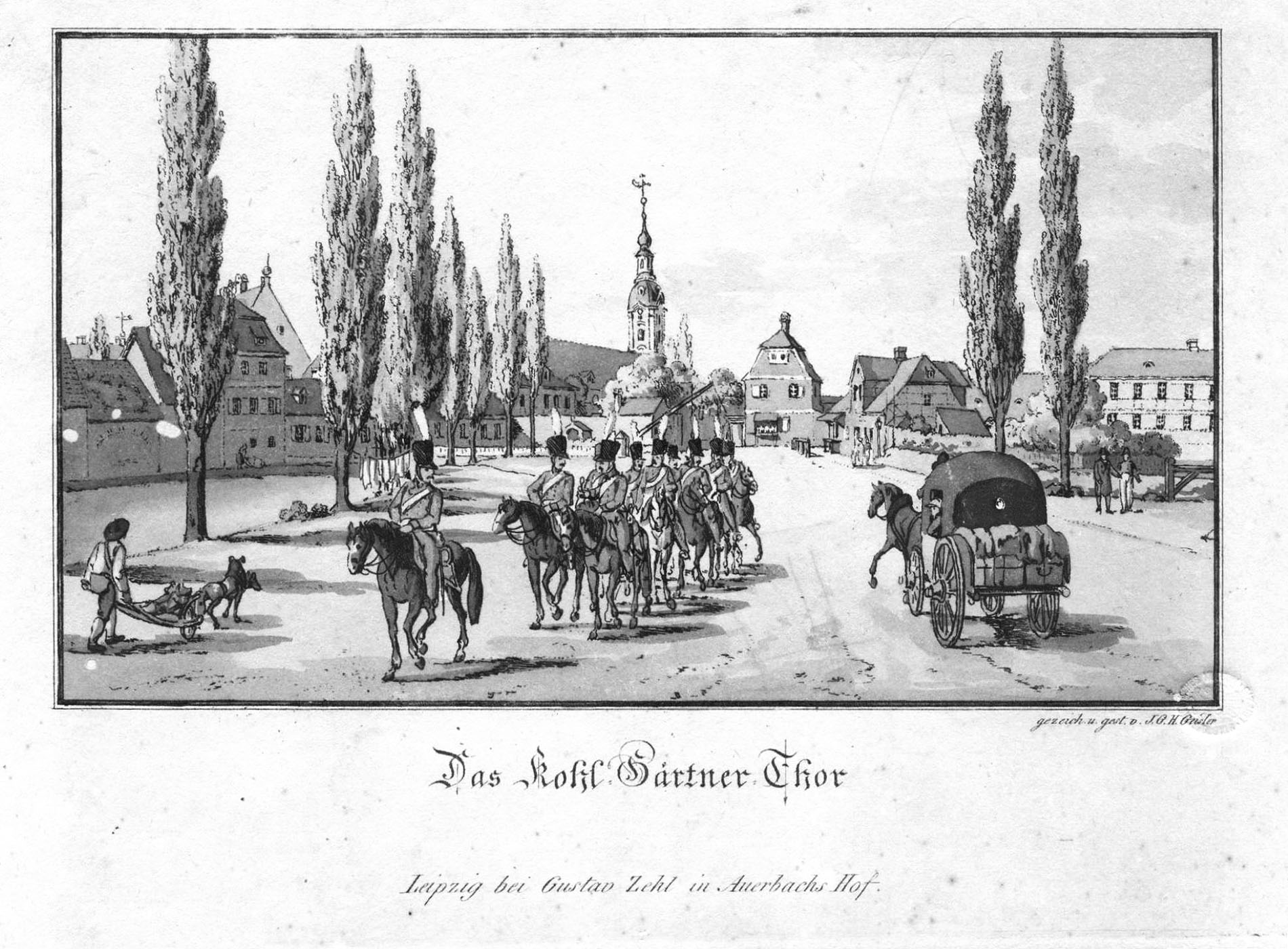
Outer Grimma Gate

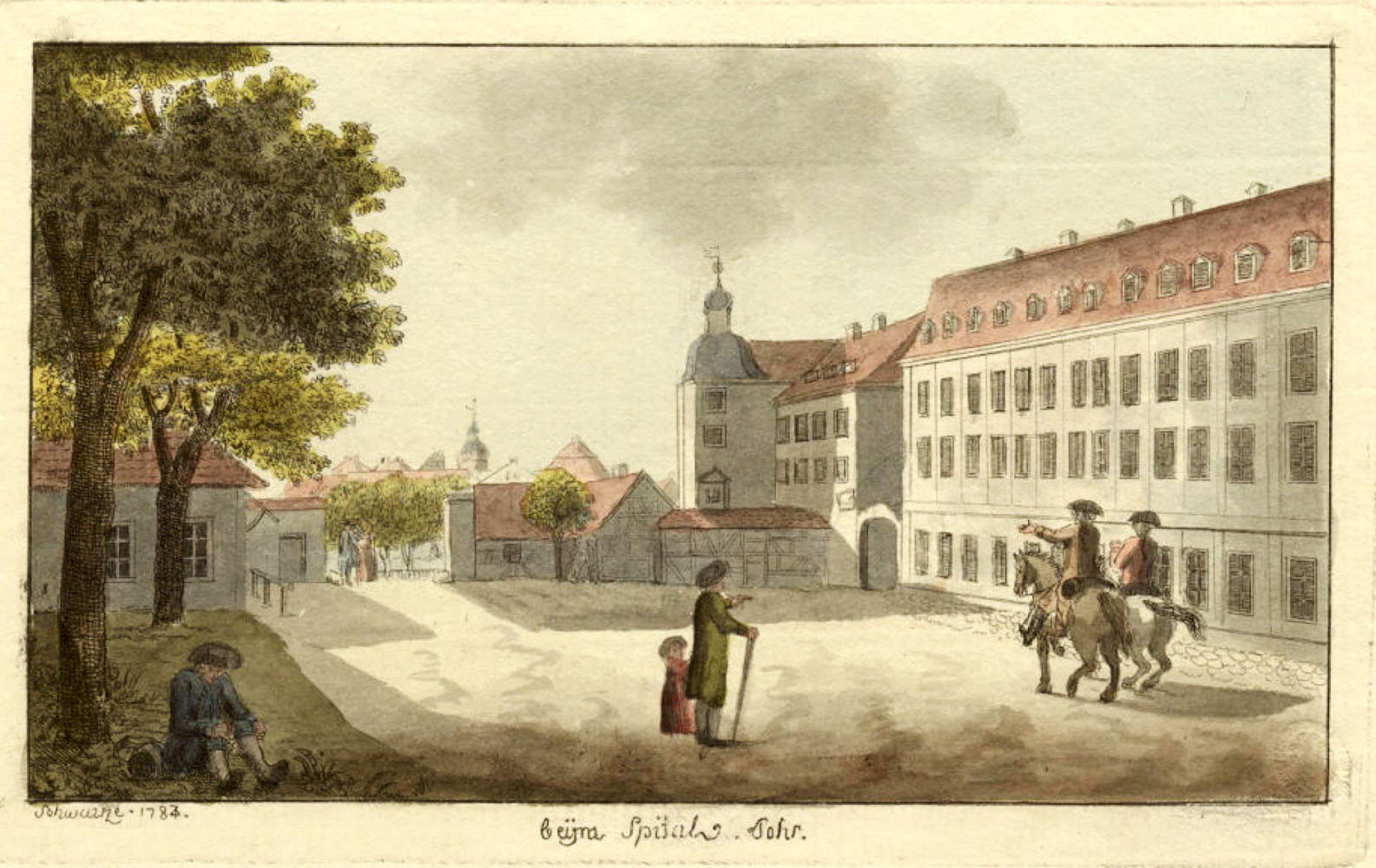
At the Hospital Gate 1787

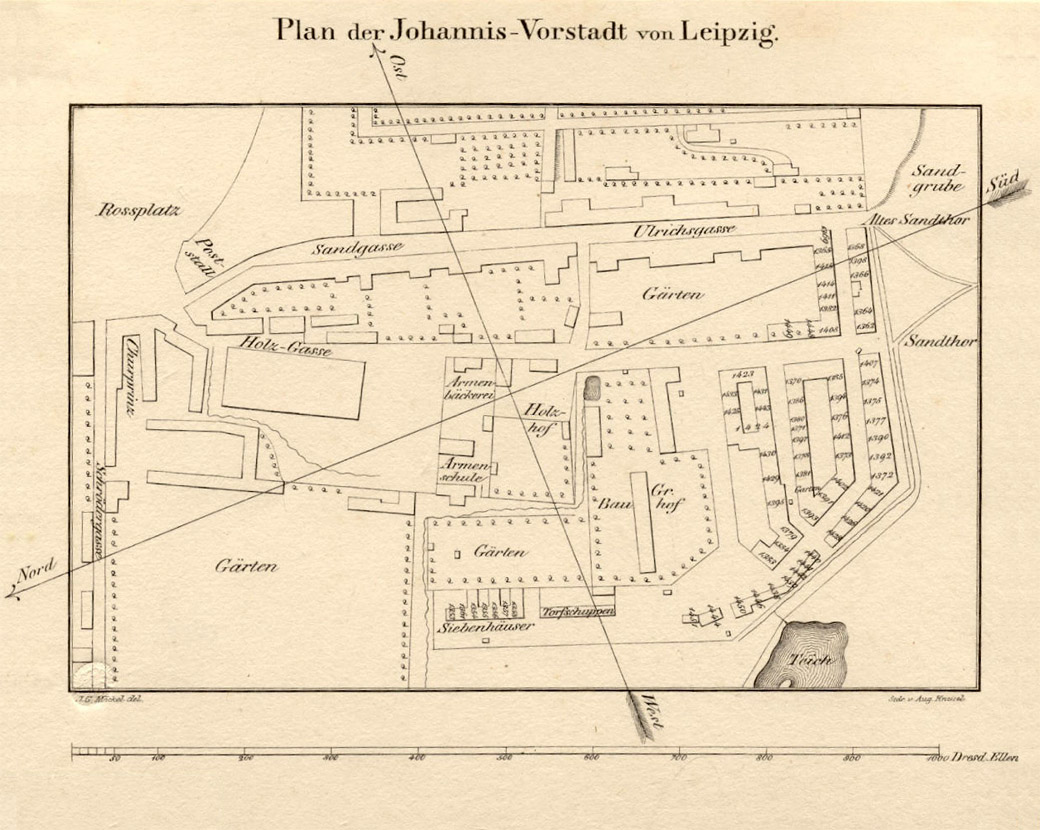
Location of the Old and New Sand Gate

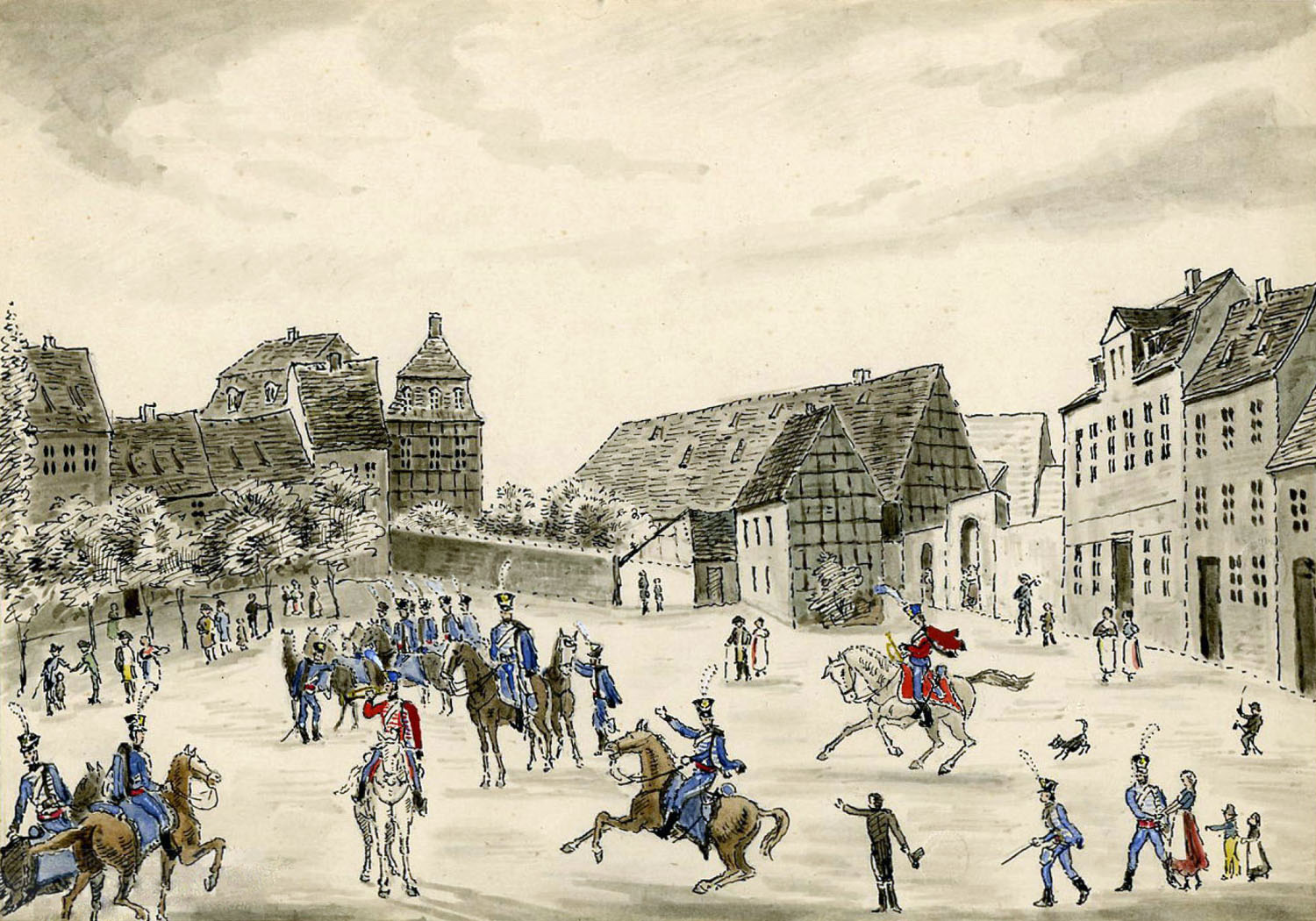
In front of the Windmill Gate around 1812

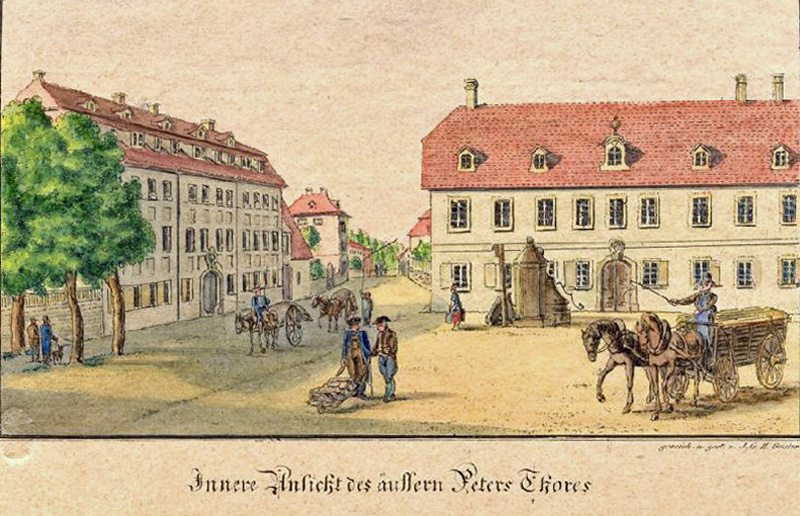
The Outer Peter's Gate from the city

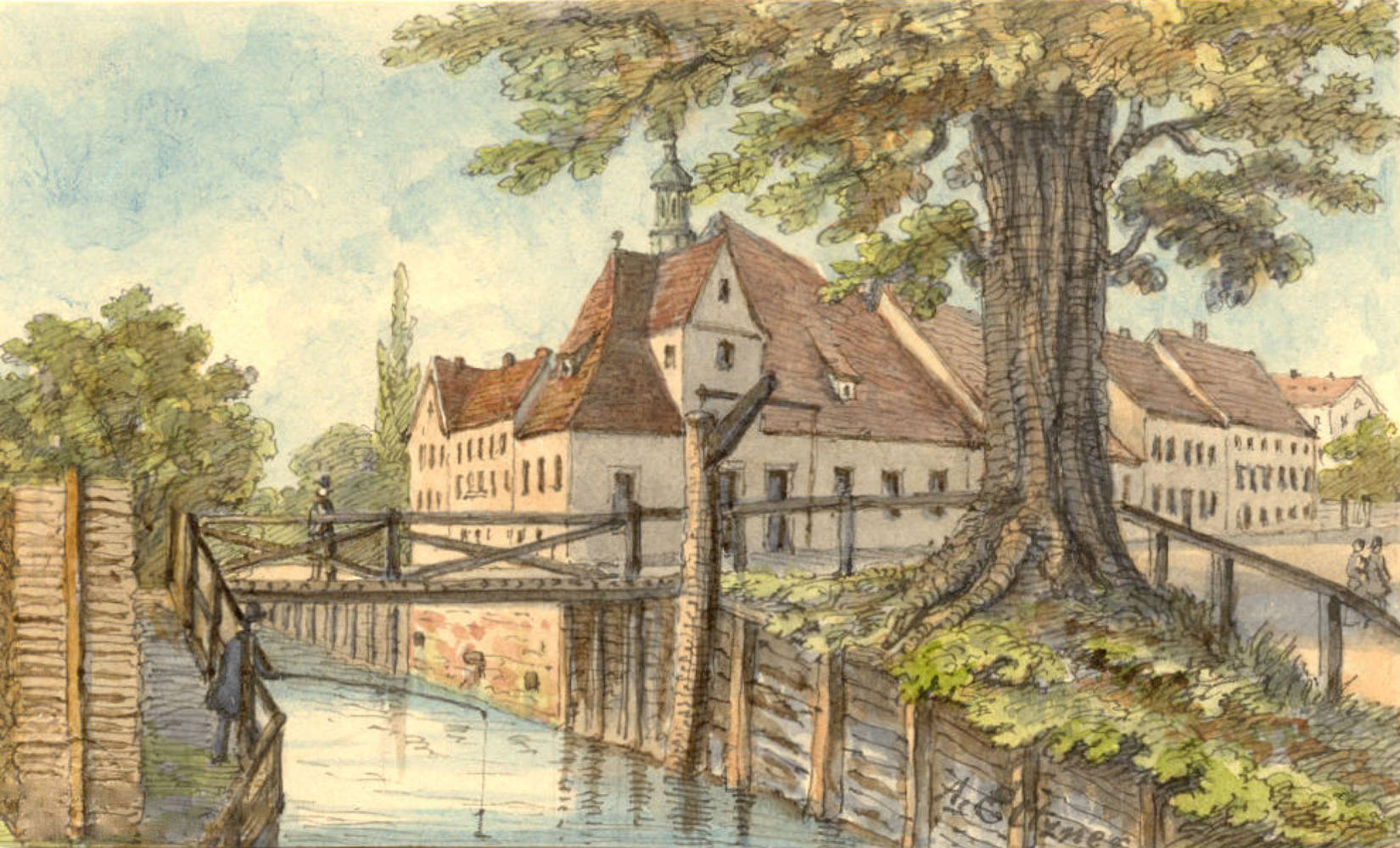
In front of the Mint Gate 1865

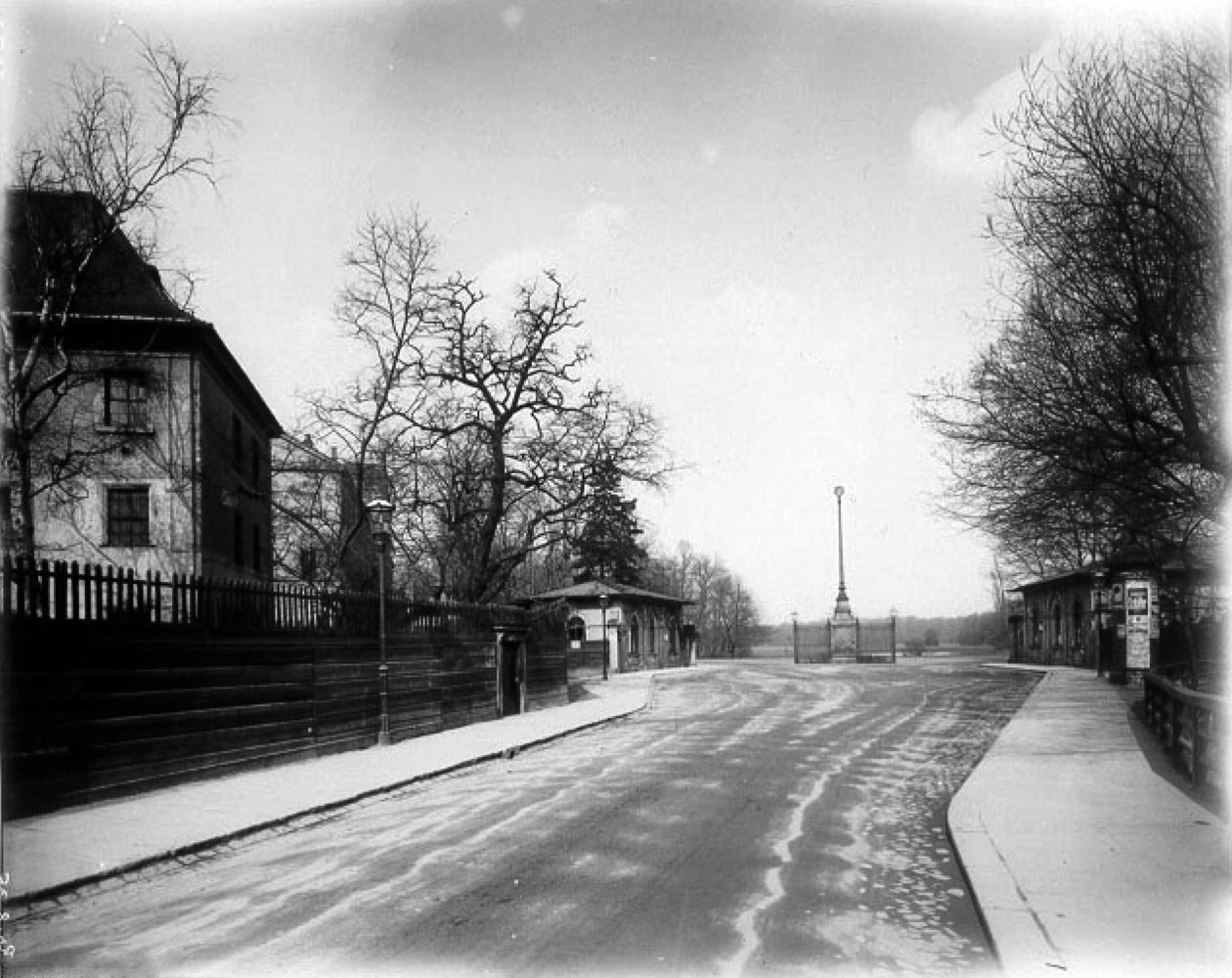
The Rosentalgasse with the gatehouses

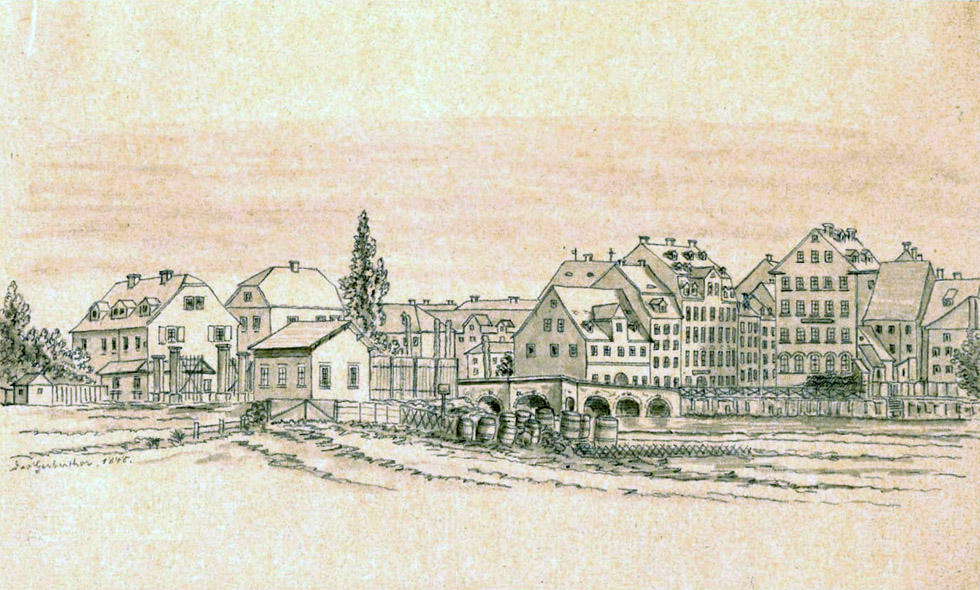
Outer Halle Gate with Gerber Bridge
